

482001–482100 

|-bgcolor=#fefefe
| 482001 ||  || — || November 14, 2006 || Kitt Peak || Spacewatch || — || align=right data-sort-value="0.77" | 770 m || 
|-id=002 bgcolor=#fefefe
| 482002 ||  || — || September 19, 2009 || Kitt Peak || Spacewatch || — || align=right data-sort-value="0.71" | 710 m || 
|-id=003 bgcolor=#fefefe
| 482003 ||  || — || November 27, 2006 || Mount Lemmon || Mount Lemmon Survey || — || align=right data-sort-value="0.64" | 640 m || 
|-id=004 bgcolor=#fefefe
| 482004 ||  || — || September 20, 2009 || Kitt Peak || Spacewatch || — || align=right data-sort-value="0.65" | 650 m || 
|-id=005 bgcolor=#fefefe
| 482005 ||  || — || September 20, 2009 || Kitt Peak || Spacewatch || — || align=right | 1.4 km || 
|-id=006 bgcolor=#fefefe
| 482006 ||  || — || September 20, 2009 || Kitt Peak || Spacewatch || — || align=right data-sort-value="0.59" | 590 m || 
|-id=007 bgcolor=#fefefe
| 482007 ||  || — || September 21, 2009 || Kitt Peak || Spacewatch || — || align=right data-sort-value="0.69" | 690 m || 
|-id=008 bgcolor=#fefefe
| 482008 ||  || — || September 26, 2009 || LightBuckets || LightBuckets Obs. || — || align=right data-sort-value="0.65" | 650 m || 
|-id=009 bgcolor=#fefefe
| 482009 ||  || — || September 16, 2009 || Mount Lemmon || Mount Lemmon Survey || — || align=right data-sort-value="0.62" | 620 m || 
|-id=010 bgcolor=#fefefe
| 482010 ||  || — || September 23, 2009 || Mount Lemmon || Mount Lemmon Survey || — || align=right data-sort-value="0.75" | 750 m || 
|-id=011 bgcolor=#fefefe
| 482011 ||  || — || September 21, 2009 || Catalina || CSS || — || align=right data-sort-value="0.86" | 860 m || 
|-id=012 bgcolor=#fefefe
| 482012 ||  || — || October 11, 2009 || La Sagra || OAM Obs. || — || align=right data-sort-value="0.87" | 870 m || 
|-id=013 bgcolor=#fefefe
| 482013 ||  || — || October 14, 2009 || La Sagra || OAM Obs. || — || align=right data-sort-value="0.82" | 820 m || 
|-id=014 bgcolor=#fefefe
| 482014 ||  || — || October 15, 2009 || Socorro || LINEAR || — || align=right data-sort-value="0.76" | 760 m || 
|-id=015 bgcolor=#fefefe
| 482015 ||  || — || October 18, 2009 || Kitt Peak || Spacewatch || — || align=right data-sort-value="0.64" | 640 m || 
|-id=016 bgcolor=#fefefe
| 482016 ||  || — || October 18, 2009 || Mount Lemmon || Mount Lemmon Survey || — || align=right data-sort-value="0.64" | 640 m || 
|-id=017 bgcolor=#fefefe
| 482017 ||  || — || September 22, 2009 || Mount Lemmon || Mount Lemmon Survey || — || align=right data-sort-value="0.74" | 740 m || 
|-id=018 bgcolor=#fefefe
| 482018 ||  || — || October 23, 2009 || Mount Lemmon || Mount Lemmon Survey || critical || align=right data-sort-value="0.78" | 780 m || 
|-id=019 bgcolor=#fefefe
| 482019 ||  || — || October 25, 2009 || Kitt Peak || Spacewatch || — || align=right | 1.3 km || 
|-id=020 bgcolor=#fefefe
| 482020 ||  || — || October 28, 2009 || Bisei SG Center || BATTeRS || — || align=right | 1.2 km || 
|-id=021 bgcolor=#fefefe
| 482021 ||  || — || October 17, 2009 || Mount Lemmon || Mount Lemmon Survey || — || align=right data-sort-value="0.75" | 750 m || 
|-id=022 bgcolor=#fefefe
| 482022 ||  || — || September 20, 2009 || Mount Lemmon || Mount Lemmon Survey || — || align=right data-sort-value="0.80" | 800 m || 
|-id=023 bgcolor=#FA8072
| 482023 ||  || — || October 16, 2009 || Catalina || CSS || — || align=right data-sort-value="0.57" | 570 m || 
|-id=024 bgcolor=#fefefe
| 482024 ||  || — || October 22, 2009 || Mount Lemmon || Mount Lemmon Survey || — || align=right | 1.1 km || 
|-id=025 bgcolor=#fefefe
| 482025 ||  || — || November 8, 2009 || Catalina || CSS || — || align=right data-sort-value="0.83" | 830 m || 
|-id=026 bgcolor=#fefefe
| 482026 ||  || — || October 14, 2009 || Mount Lemmon || Mount Lemmon Survey || — || align=right data-sort-value="0.86" | 860 m || 
|-id=027 bgcolor=#fefefe
| 482027 ||  || — || November 8, 2009 || Kitt Peak || Spacewatch || (1338) || align=right data-sort-value="0.69" | 690 m || 
|-id=028 bgcolor=#fefefe
| 482028 ||  || — || September 18, 2009 || Mount Lemmon || Mount Lemmon Survey || — || align=right data-sort-value="0.64" | 640 m || 
|-id=029 bgcolor=#fefefe
| 482029 ||  || — || November 9, 2009 || Mount Lemmon || Mount Lemmon Survey || — || align=right data-sort-value="0.85" | 850 m || 
|-id=030 bgcolor=#fefefe
| 482030 ||  || — || October 23, 2009 || Mount Lemmon || Mount Lemmon Survey || — || align=right data-sort-value="0.81" | 810 m || 
|-id=031 bgcolor=#fefefe
| 482031 ||  || — || November 10, 2009 || Kitt Peak || Spacewatch || (2076) || align=right data-sort-value="0.76" | 760 m || 
|-id=032 bgcolor=#fefefe
| 482032 ||  || — || September 22, 2009 || Mount Lemmon || Mount Lemmon Survey || — || align=right data-sort-value="0.87" | 870 m || 
|-id=033 bgcolor=#fefefe
| 482033 ||  || — || March 16, 2004 || Kitt Peak || Spacewatch || — || align=right data-sort-value="0.62" | 620 m || 
|-id=034 bgcolor=#fefefe
| 482034 ||  || — || October 27, 2009 || Kitt Peak || Spacewatch || — || align=right data-sort-value="0.76" | 760 m || 
|-id=035 bgcolor=#fefefe
| 482035 ||  || — || November 18, 2009 || Kitt Peak || Spacewatch || — || align=right data-sort-value="0.78" | 780 m || 
|-id=036 bgcolor=#fefefe
| 482036 ||  || — || October 27, 2009 || Kitt Peak || Spacewatch || — || align=right data-sort-value="0.64" | 640 m || 
|-id=037 bgcolor=#fefefe
| 482037 ||  || — || November 17, 2009 || Kitt Peak || Spacewatch || — || align=right data-sort-value="0.73" | 730 m || 
|-id=038 bgcolor=#fefefe
| 482038 ||  || — || November 10, 2009 || Kitt Peak || Spacewatch || — || align=right data-sort-value="0.90" | 900 m || 
|-id=039 bgcolor=#FA8072
| 482039 ||  || — || September 17, 1998 || Anderson Mesa || LONEOS || — || align=right data-sort-value="0.81" | 810 m || 
|-id=040 bgcolor=#fefefe
| 482040 ||  || — || November 21, 2006 || Mount Lemmon || Mount Lemmon Survey || — || align=right data-sort-value="0.94" | 940 m || 
|-id=041 bgcolor=#fefefe
| 482041 ||  || — || November 25, 2009 || Mayhill || iTelescope Obs. || — || align=right data-sort-value="0.63" | 630 m || 
|-id=042 bgcolor=#fefefe
| 482042 ||  || — || November 19, 2009 || Kitt Peak || Spacewatch || — || align=right data-sort-value="0.80" | 800 m || 
|-id=043 bgcolor=#fefefe
| 482043 ||  || — || November 21, 2009 || Kitt Peak || Spacewatch || — || align=right data-sort-value="0.65" | 650 m || 
|-id=044 bgcolor=#fefefe
| 482044 ||  || — || November 16, 2009 || Kitt Peak || Spacewatch || V || align=right data-sort-value="0.59" | 590 m || 
|-id=045 bgcolor=#fefefe
| 482045 ||  || — || December 13, 2006 || Kitt Peak || Spacewatch || — || align=right | 1.8 km || 
|-id=046 bgcolor=#fefefe
| 482046 ||  || — || November 21, 2009 || Kitt Peak || Spacewatch || — || align=right data-sort-value="0.69" | 690 m || 
|-id=047 bgcolor=#fefefe
| 482047 ||  || — || November 22, 2009 || Kitt Peak || Spacewatch || — || align=right data-sort-value="0.68" | 680 m || 
|-id=048 bgcolor=#FA8072
| 482048 ||  || — || November 16, 2009 || Kitt Peak || Spacewatch || — || align=right data-sort-value="0.86" | 860 m || 
|-id=049 bgcolor=#FFC2E0
| 482049 ||  || — || December 15, 2009 || Mount Lemmon || Mount Lemmon Survey || AMO || align=right data-sort-value="0.60" | 600 m || 
|-id=050 bgcolor=#fefefe
| 482050 ||  || — || December 15, 2009 || Mount Lemmon || Mount Lemmon Survey || — || align=right data-sort-value="0.65" | 650 m || 
|-id=051 bgcolor=#fefefe
| 482051 ||  || — || November 16, 2009 || Mount Lemmon || Mount Lemmon Survey || (5026) || align=right data-sort-value="0.60" | 600 m || 
|-id=052 bgcolor=#fefefe
| 482052 ||  || — || December 17, 2009 || Mount Lemmon || Mount Lemmon Survey || — || align=right data-sort-value="0.91" | 910 m || 
|-id=053 bgcolor=#fefefe
| 482053 ||  || — || October 6, 2005 || Catalina || CSS || — || align=right data-sort-value="0.79" | 790 m || 
|-id=054 bgcolor=#FFC2E0
| 482054 ||  || — || January 5, 2010 || Kitt Peak || Spacewatch || APO || align=right data-sort-value="0.41" | 410 m || 
|-id=055 bgcolor=#FFC2E0
| 482055 ||  || — || January 10, 2010 || Mount Lemmon || Mount Lemmon Survey || AMOcritical || align=right | 1.9 km || 
|-id=056 bgcolor=#fefefe
| 482056 ||  || — || January 10, 2010 || Kitt Peak || Spacewatch || — || align=right data-sort-value="0.56" | 560 m || 
|-id=057 bgcolor=#fefefe
| 482057 ||  || — || January 12, 2010 || Catalina || CSS || — || align=right data-sort-value="0.95" | 950 m || 
|-id=058 bgcolor=#d6d6d6
| 482058 ||  || — || January 12, 2010 || Mount Lemmon || Mount Lemmon Survey || 3:2 || align=right | 5.1 km || 
|-id=059 bgcolor=#fefefe
| 482059 ||  || — || April 29, 2003 || Kitt Peak || Spacewatch || — || align=right data-sort-value="0.75" | 750 m || 
|-id=060 bgcolor=#fefefe
| 482060 ||  || — || January 23, 2010 || Bisei SG Center || BATTeRS || — || align=right | 2.0 km || 
|-id=061 bgcolor=#E9E9E9
| 482061 ||  || — || January 21, 2010 || WISE || WISE || — || align=right | 2.8 km || 
|-id=062 bgcolor=#fefefe
| 482062 ||  || — || January 21, 1996 || Kitt Peak || Spacewatch || — || align=right data-sort-value="0.68" | 680 m || 
|-id=063 bgcolor=#fefefe
| 482063 ||  || — || February 6, 2010 || Mayhill || A. Lowe || — || align=right | 1.0 km || 
|-id=064 bgcolor=#fefefe
| 482064 ||  || — || November 24, 2009 || Mount Lemmon || Mount Lemmon Survey || — || align=right data-sort-value="0.81" | 810 m || 
|-id=065 bgcolor=#fefefe
| 482065 ||  || — || February 10, 2010 || Kitt Peak || Spacewatch || — || align=right | 1.5 km || 
|-id=066 bgcolor=#fefefe
| 482066 ||  || — || February 13, 2010 || Mount Lemmon || Mount Lemmon Survey || NYS || align=right data-sort-value="0.53" | 530 m || 
|-id=067 bgcolor=#fefefe
| 482067 ||  || — || February 14, 2010 || Kitt Peak || Spacewatch || MAS || align=right data-sort-value="0.63" | 630 m || 
|-id=068 bgcolor=#fefefe
| 482068 ||  || — || January 23, 2006 || Mount Lemmon || Mount Lemmon Survey || — || align=right data-sort-value="0.79" | 790 m || 
|-id=069 bgcolor=#fefefe
| 482069 ||  || — || December 5, 2005 || Kitt Peak || Spacewatch || NYS || align=right data-sort-value="0.55" | 550 m || 
|-id=070 bgcolor=#E9E9E9
| 482070 ||  || — || February 15, 2010 || WISE || WISE || — || align=right | 2.5 km || 
|-id=071 bgcolor=#fefefe
| 482071 ||  || — || February 15, 2010 || Mount Lemmon || Mount Lemmon Survey || — || align=right | 1.7 km || 
|-id=072 bgcolor=#fefefe
| 482072 ||  || — || December 18, 2009 || Mount Lemmon || Mount Lemmon Survey || — || align=right data-sort-value="0.90" | 900 m || 
|-id=073 bgcolor=#E9E9E9
| 482073 ||  || — || February 18, 2010 || WISE || WISE || — || align=right | 2.7 km || 
|-id=074 bgcolor=#fefefe
| 482074 ||  || — || January 12, 2010 || Kitt Peak || Spacewatch || NYS || align=right data-sort-value="0.58" | 580 m || 
|-id=075 bgcolor=#fefefe
| 482075 ||  || — || February 16, 2010 || Mount Lemmon || Mount Lemmon Survey || — || align=right | 1.9 km || 
|-id=076 bgcolor=#fefefe
| 482076 ||  || — || March 4, 2010 || Kitt Peak || Spacewatch || MAS || align=right data-sort-value="0.65" | 650 m || 
|-id=077 bgcolor=#fefefe
| 482077 ||  || — || February 10, 2010 || Kitt Peak || Spacewatch || MAS || align=right data-sort-value="0.61" | 610 m || 
|-id=078 bgcolor=#fefefe
| 482078 ||  || — || March 12, 2010 || Purple Mountain || PMO NEO || — || align=right | 1.2 km || 
|-id=079 bgcolor=#E9E9E9
| 482079 ||  || — || March 12, 2010 || Mount Lemmon || Mount Lemmon Survey || — || align=right | 1.0 km || 
|-id=080 bgcolor=#fefefe
| 482080 ||  || — || March 13, 2010 || Kitt Peak || Spacewatch || H || align=right data-sort-value="0.52" | 520 m || 
|-id=081 bgcolor=#fefefe
| 482081 ||  || — || March 15, 2010 || Mount Lemmon || Mount Lemmon Survey || — || align=right | 1.5 km || 
|-id=082 bgcolor=#E9E9E9
| 482082 ||  || — || March 15, 2010 || Catalina || CSS || — || align=right | 1.4 km || 
|-id=083 bgcolor=#fefefe
| 482083 ||  || — || March 15, 2010 || Mount Lemmon || Mount Lemmon Survey || — || align=right data-sort-value="0.79" | 790 m || 
|-id=084 bgcolor=#FA8072
| 482084 ||  || — || March 16, 2010 || Bisei SG Center || BATTeRS || — || align=right data-sort-value="0.56" | 560 m || 
|-id=085 bgcolor=#fefefe
| 482085 ||  || — || November 1, 2008 || Kitt Peak || Spacewatch || MAS || align=right data-sort-value="0.62" | 620 m || 
|-id=086 bgcolor=#fefefe
| 482086 ||  || — || December 15, 2009 || Mount Lemmon || Mount Lemmon Survey || — || align=right | 2.1 km || 
|-id=087 bgcolor=#C2FFFF
| 482087 ||  || — || April 22, 2010 || WISE || WISE || L5 || align=right | 13 km || 
|-id=088 bgcolor=#C2FFFF
| 482088 ||  || — || April 25, 2010 || WISE || WISE || L5 || align=right | 13 km || 
|-id=089 bgcolor=#E9E9E9
| 482089 ||  || — || April 8, 2010 || Kitt Peak || Spacewatch || — || align=right | 2.3 km || 
|-id=090 bgcolor=#fefefe
| 482090 ||  || — || May 4, 2010 || Kitt Peak || Spacewatch || H || align=right data-sort-value="0.64" | 640 m || 
|-id=091 bgcolor=#fefefe
| 482091 ||  || — || April 20, 2007 || Kitt Peak || Spacewatch || — || align=right | 1.5 km || 
|-id=092 bgcolor=#E9E9E9
| 482092 ||  || — || February 9, 2010 || WISE || WISE || — || align=right | 2.1 km || 
|-id=093 bgcolor=#E9E9E9
| 482093 ||  || — || May 13, 2010 || Kitt Peak || Spacewatch || — || align=right | 1.1 km || 
|-id=094 bgcolor=#d6d6d6
| 482094 ||  || — || June 8, 2010 || WISE || WISE || THB || align=right | 2.5 km || 
|-id=095 bgcolor=#d6d6d6
| 482095 ||  || — || June 13, 2010 || WISE || WISE || — || align=right | 3.4 km || 
|-id=096 bgcolor=#d6d6d6
| 482096 ||  || — || June 13, 2010 || WISE || WISE || — || align=right | 2.3 km || 
|-id=097 bgcolor=#d6d6d6
| 482097 ||  || — || June 16, 2010 || WISE || WISE || — || align=right | 2.9 km || 
|-id=098 bgcolor=#d6d6d6
| 482098 ||  || — || June 20, 2010 || Mount Lemmon || Mount Lemmon Survey || — || align=right | 4.5 km || 
|-id=099 bgcolor=#d6d6d6
| 482099 ||  || — || June 17, 2010 || WISE || WISE || — || align=right | 2.6 km || 
|-id=100 bgcolor=#d6d6d6
| 482100 ||  || — || June 19, 2010 || WISE || WISE || — || align=right | 3.7 km || 
|}

482101–482200 

|-bgcolor=#E9E9E9
| 482101 ||  || — || March 16, 2010 || Catalina || CSS || — || align=right | 2.9 km || 
|-id=102 bgcolor=#d6d6d6
| 482102 ||  || — || October 12, 1999 || Socorro || LINEAR || Tj (2.98) || align=right | 3.2 km || 
|-id=103 bgcolor=#d6d6d6
| 482103 ||  || — || June 24, 2010 || WISE || WISE || LIX || align=right | 3.6 km || 
|-id=104 bgcolor=#d6d6d6
| 482104 ||  || — || June 25, 2010 || WISE || WISE || — || align=right | 5.4 km || 
|-id=105 bgcolor=#d6d6d6
| 482105 ||  || — || June 26, 2010 || WISE || WISE || — || align=right | 3.1 km || 
|-id=106 bgcolor=#d6d6d6
| 482106 ||  || — || June 26, 2010 || WISE || WISE || — || align=right | 3.4 km || 
|-id=107 bgcolor=#d6d6d6
| 482107 ||  || — || June 26, 2010 || WISE || WISE || — || align=right | 3.8 km || 
|-id=108 bgcolor=#d6d6d6
| 482108 ||  || — || June 27, 2010 || WISE || WISE || — || align=right | 4.3 km || 
|-id=109 bgcolor=#d6d6d6
| 482109 ||  || — || June 29, 2010 || WISE || WISE || — || align=right | 3.8 km || 
|-id=110 bgcolor=#d6d6d6
| 482110 ||  || — || June 30, 2010 || WISE || WISE || — || align=right | 3.4 km || 
|-id=111 bgcolor=#FFC2E0
| 482111 ||  || — || July 4, 2010 || WISE || WISE || AMOcritical || align=right data-sort-value="0.38" | 380 m || 
|-id=112 bgcolor=#d6d6d6
| 482112 ||  || — || July 6, 2010 || WISE || WISE || THB || align=right | 3.2 km || 
|-id=113 bgcolor=#d6d6d6
| 482113 ||  || — || July 2, 2010 || WISE || WISE || — || align=right | 3.7 km || 
|-id=114 bgcolor=#d6d6d6
| 482114 ||  || — || July 8, 2010 || WISE || WISE || — || align=right | 3.0 km || 
|-id=115 bgcolor=#d6d6d6
| 482115 ||  || — || July 10, 2010 || WISE || WISE || — || align=right | 2.2 km || 
|-id=116 bgcolor=#d6d6d6
| 482116 ||  || — || December 3, 2005 || Kitt Peak || Spacewatch || — || align=right | 4.0 km || 
|-id=117 bgcolor=#d6d6d6
| 482117 ||  || — || October 12, 1999 || Socorro || LINEAR || Tj (2.9) || align=right | 3.4 km || 
|-id=118 bgcolor=#d6d6d6
| 482118 ||  || — || November 25, 2005 || Kitt Peak || Spacewatch || Tj (2.99) || align=right | 3.9 km || 
|-id=119 bgcolor=#d6d6d6
| 482119 ||  || — || July 18, 2010 || WISE || WISE || — || align=right | 4.1 km || 
|-id=120 bgcolor=#d6d6d6
| 482120 ||  || — || July 18, 2010 || WISE || WISE || — || align=right | 1.7 km || 
|-id=121 bgcolor=#d6d6d6
| 482121 ||  || — || July 21, 2010 || WISE || WISE || — || align=right | 3.0 km || 
|-id=122 bgcolor=#d6d6d6
| 482122 ||  || — || July 26, 2010 || WISE || WISE || — || align=right | 2.7 km || 
|-id=123 bgcolor=#d6d6d6
| 482123 ||  || — || April 1, 2008 || Kitt Peak || Spacewatch || VER || align=right | 3.7 km || 
|-id=124 bgcolor=#d6d6d6
| 482124 ||  || — || July 31, 2010 || WISE || WISE || — || align=right | 4.1 km || 
|-id=125 bgcolor=#d6d6d6
| 482125 ||  || — || August 15, 2004 || Siding Spring || SSS || — || align=right | 4.2 km || 
|-id=126 bgcolor=#d6d6d6
| 482126 ||  || — || June 19, 2010 || Mount Lemmon || Mount Lemmon Survey || — || align=right | 3.2 km || 
|-id=127 bgcolor=#d6d6d6
| 482127 ||  || — || August 10, 2010 || WISE || WISE || — || align=right | 3.3 km || 
|-id=128 bgcolor=#FA8072
| 482128 ||  || — || June 19, 2010 || Mount Lemmon || Mount Lemmon Survey || H || align=right data-sort-value="0.85" | 850 m || 
|-id=129 bgcolor=#d6d6d6
| 482129 ||  || — || September 1, 2010 || ESA OGS || ESA OGS || — || align=right | 2.0 km || 
|-id=130 bgcolor=#d6d6d6
| 482130 ||  || — || July 11, 2010 || WISE || WISE || — || align=right | 2.4 km || 
|-id=131 bgcolor=#d6d6d6
| 482131 ||  || — || March 9, 2008 || Kitt Peak || Spacewatch || — || align=right | 3.3 km || 
|-id=132 bgcolor=#d6d6d6
| 482132 ||  || — || January 28, 2007 || Mount Lemmon || Mount Lemmon Survey || — || align=right | 1.9 km || 
|-id=133 bgcolor=#d6d6d6
| 482133 ||  || — || January 27, 2007 || Mount Lemmon || Mount Lemmon Survey || — || align=right | 2.6 km || 
|-id=134 bgcolor=#d6d6d6
| 482134 ||  || — || September 15, 2010 || Kitt Peak || Spacewatch || — || align=right | 2.9 km || 
|-id=135 bgcolor=#d6d6d6
| 482135 ||  || — || September 15, 2010 || Kitt Peak || Spacewatch || — || align=right | 3.5 km || 
|-id=136 bgcolor=#d6d6d6
| 482136 ||  || — || September 4, 2010 || Kitt Peak || Spacewatch || — || align=right | 2.5 km || 
|-id=137 bgcolor=#d6d6d6
| 482137 ||  || — || September 9, 2010 || Kitt Peak || Spacewatch || — || align=right | 2.5 km || 
|-id=138 bgcolor=#d6d6d6
| 482138 ||  || — || September 10, 2010 || Kitt Peak || Spacewatch || — || align=right | 2.3 km || 
|-id=139 bgcolor=#d6d6d6
| 482139 ||  || — || July 9, 2010 || WISE || WISE || — || align=right | 3.0 km || 
|-id=140 bgcolor=#d6d6d6
| 482140 ||  || — || March 15, 2007 || Kitt Peak || Spacewatch || — || align=right | 2.8 km || 
|-id=141 bgcolor=#d6d6d6
| 482141 ||  || — || November 30, 1999 || Kitt Peak || Spacewatch || — || align=right | 2.7 km || 
|-id=142 bgcolor=#d6d6d6
| 482142 ||  || — || September 18, 2010 || Mount Lemmon || Mount Lemmon Survey || EOS || align=right | 2.3 km || 
|-id=143 bgcolor=#d6d6d6
| 482143 ||  || — || September 18, 2010 || Kitt Peak || Spacewatch || — || align=right | 2.4 km || 
|-id=144 bgcolor=#d6d6d6
| 482144 ||  || — || June 24, 2010 || WISE || WISE || — || align=right | 2.3 km || 
|-id=145 bgcolor=#d6d6d6
| 482145 ||  || — || September 2, 2010 || Mount Lemmon || Mount Lemmon Survey || EMA || align=right | 2.7 km || 
|-id=146 bgcolor=#d6d6d6
| 482146 ||  || — || August 22, 2004 || Kitt Peak || Spacewatch || — || align=right | 2.0 km || 
|-id=147 bgcolor=#d6d6d6
| 482147 ||  || — || September 3, 1999 || Kitt Peak || Spacewatch || — || align=right | 2.0 km || 
|-id=148 bgcolor=#d6d6d6
| 482148 ||  || — || September 15, 2010 || Kitt Peak || Spacewatch || — || align=right | 2.3 km || 
|-id=149 bgcolor=#d6d6d6
| 482149 ||  || — || November 4, 2005 || Mount Lemmon || Mount Lemmon Survey || — || align=right | 2.7 km || 
|-id=150 bgcolor=#d6d6d6
| 482150 ||  || — || July 10, 2010 || WISE || WISE || THM || align=right | 1.8 km || 
|-id=151 bgcolor=#d6d6d6
| 482151 ||  || — || November 1, 2005 || Kitt Peak || Spacewatch || — || align=right | 2.2 km || 
|-id=152 bgcolor=#d6d6d6
| 482152 ||  || — || October 2, 2010 || Kitt Peak || Spacewatch || — || align=right | 2.0 km || 
|-id=153 bgcolor=#d6d6d6
| 482153 ||  || — || October 2, 2010 || Kitt Peak || Spacewatch || — || align=right | 2.4 km || 
|-id=154 bgcolor=#d6d6d6
| 482154 ||  || — || October 3, 2010 || Catalina || CSS || — || align=right | 2.6 km || 
|-id=155 bgcolor=#fefefe
| 482155 ||  || — || February 24, 2009 || Catalina || CSS || H || align=right data-sort-value="0.85" | 850 m || 
|-id=156 bgcolor=#d6d6d6
| 482156 ||  || — || September 8, 2010 || Kitt Peak || Spacewatch || — || align=right | 2.3 km || 
|-id=157 bgcolor=#d6d6d6
| 482157 ||  || — || September 4, 2010 || Kitt Peak || Spacewatch || — || align=right | 2.9 km || 
|-id=158 bgcolor=#d6d6d6
| 482158 ||  || — || September 30, 2010 || Catalina || CSS || — || align=right | 2.8 km || 
|-id=159 bgcolor=#d6d6d6
| 482159 ||  || — || September 17, 2010 || Kitt Peak || Spacewatch || EOS || align=right | 2.2 km || 
|-id=160 bgcolor=#d6d6d6
| 482160 ||  || — || September 17, 2010 || Kitt Peak || Spacewatch || — || align=right | 2.9 km || 
|-id=161 bgcolor=#d6d6d6
| 482161 ||  || — || September 30, 2010 || Mount Lemmon || Mount Lemmon Survey || VER || align=right | 2.6 km || 
|-id=162 bgcolor=#d6d6d6
| 482162 ||  || — || May 30, 2009 || Mount Lemmon || Mount Lemmon Survey || LIX || align=right | 3.0 km || 
|-id=163 bgcolor=#d6d6d6
| 482163 ||  || — || July 9, 2010 || WISE || WISE || URS || align=right | 2.3 km || 
|-id=164 bgcolor=#d6d6d6
| 482164 ||  || — || March 11, 2007 || Kitt Peak || Spacewatch || — || align=right | 2.7 km || 
|-id=165 bgcolor=#d6d6d6
| 482165 ||  || — || October 27, 2005 || Kitt Peak || Spacewatch || HYG || align=right | 1.7 km || 
|-id=166 bgcolor=#d6d6d6
| 482166 ||  || — || June 28, 2010 || WISE || WISE || — || align=right | 2.3 km || 
|-id=167 bgcolor=#d6d6d6
| 482167 ||  || — || October 30, 2005 || Mount Lemmon || Mount Lemmon Survey || — || align=right | 2.8 km || 
|-id=168 bgcolor=#d6d6d6
| 482168 ||  || — || October 26, 2005 || Kitt Peak || Spacewatch || — || align=right | 2.3 km || 
|-id=169 bgcolor=#d6d6d6
| 482169 ||  || — || December 30, 2005 || Mount Lemmon || Mount Lemmon Survey || — || align=right | 2.1 km || 
|-id=170 bgcolor=#d6d6d6
| 482170 ||  || — || September 17, 2010 || Mount Lemmon || Mount Lemmon Survey || — || align=right | 2.5 km || 
|-id=171 bgcolor=#d6d6d6
| 482171 ||  || — || September 18, 2010 || Mount Lemmon || Mount Lemmon Survey || — || align=right | 3.3 km || 
|-id=172 bgcolor=#d6d6d6
| 482172 ||  || — || October 9, 2010 || Catalina || CSS || — || align=right | 4.0 km || 
|-id=173 bgcolor=#d6d6d6
| 482173 ||  || — || September 19, 2010 || Kitt Peak || Spacewatch || — || align=right | 2.8 km || 
|-id=174 bgcolor=#d6d6d6
| 482174 ||  || — || October 3, 2005 || Kitt Peak || Spacewatch || — || align=right | 2.2 km || 
|-id=175 bgcolor=#d6d6d6
| 482175 ||  || — || July 30, 2010 || WISE || WISE || — || align=right | 3.6 km || 
|-id=176 bgcolor=#d6d6d6
| 482176 ||  || — || March 10, 2007 || Mount Lemmon || Mount Lemmon Survey || — || align=right | 2.9 km || 
|-id=177 bgcolor=#fefefe
| 482177 ||  || — || March 18, 2009 || Catalina || CSS || H || align=right data-sort-value="0.99" | 990 m || 
|-id=178 bgcolor=#d6d6d6
| 482178 ||  || — || October 17, 2010 || Mount Lemmon || Mount Lemmon Survey || — || align=right | 2.2 km || 
|-id=179 bgcolor=#d6d6d6
| 482179 ||  || — || April 5, 2008 || Kitt Peak || Spacewatch || — || align=right | 2.9 km || 
|-id=180 bgcolor=#d6d6d6
| 482180 ||  || — || September 30, 2010 || Mount Lemmon || Mount Lemmon Survey || — || align=right | 3.0 km || 
|-id=181 bgcolor=#d6d6d6
| 482181 ||  || — || October 11, 2010 || Mount Lemmon || Mount Lemmon Survey || — || align=right | 3.1 km || 
|-id=182 bgcolor=#d6d6d6
| 482182 ||  || — || April 22, 2007 || Kitt Peak || Spacewatch || Tj (2.99) || align=right | 3.5 km || 
|-id=183 bgcolor=#d6d6d6
| 482183 ||  || — || October 14, 2010 || Mount Lemmon || Mount Lemmon Survey || EOS || align=right | 1.8 km || 
|-id=184 bgcolor=#d6d6d6
| 482184 ||  || — || October 30, 2010 || Catalina || CSS || — || align=right | 3.8 km || 
|-id=185 bgcolor=#d6d6d6
| 482185 ||  || — || October 14, 2010 || Mount Lemmon || Mount Lemmon Survey || — || align=right | 3.7 km || 
|-id=186 bgcolor=#d6d6d6
| 482186 ||  || — || August 1, 2010 || WISE || WISE || — || align=right | 3.0 km || 
|-id=187 bgcolor=#d6d6d6
| 482187 ||  || — || October 13, 2010 || Mount Lemmon || Mount Lemmon Survey || — || align=right | 4.0 km || 
|-id=188 bgcolor=#d6d6d6
| 482188 ||  || — || October 30, 2010 || Catalina || CSS || VER || align=right | 3.3 km || 
|-id=189 bgcolor=#d6d6d6
| 482189 ||  || — || October 11, 2010 || Catalina || CSS || — || align=right | 3.2 km || 
|-id=190 bgcolor=#d6d6d6
| 482190 ||  || — || October 13, 2010 || Mount Lemmon || Mount Lemmon Survey || EOS || align=right | 2.0 km || 
|-id=191 bgcolor=#d6d6d6
| 482191 ||  || — || July 25, 2010 || WISE || WISE || — || align=right | 2.2 km || 
|-id=192 bgcolor=#d6d6d6
| 482192 ||  || — || October 31, 2010 || Kitt Peak || Spacewatch || — || align=right | 3.6 km || 
|-id=193 bgcolor=#d6d6d6
| 482193 ||  || — || December 4, 2005 || Kitt Peak || Spacewatch || THM || align=right | 1.5 km || 
|-id=194 bgcolor=#d6d6d6
| 482194 ||  || — || October 11, 2010 || Mount Lemmon || Mount Lemmon Survey || VER || align=right | 2.4 km || 
|-id=195 bgcolor=#d6d6d6
| 482195 ||  || — || March 14, 2007 || Kitt Peak || Spacewatch || — || align=right | 2.9 km || 
|-id=196 bgcolor=#d6d6d6
| 482196 ||  || — || November 6, 2010 || Mount Lemmon || Mount Lemmon Survey || — || align=right | 2.1 km || 
|-id=197 bgcolor=#d6d6d6
| 482197 ||  || — || October 28, 2010 || Mount Lemmon || Mount Lemmon Survey || 7:4 || align=right | 3.1 km || 
|-id=198 bgcolor=#d6d6d6
| 482198 ||  || — || November 17, 2004 || Campo Imperatore || CINEOS || — || align=right | 2.9 km || 
|-id=199 bgcolor=#d6d6d6
| 482199 ||  || — || September 11, 2010 || Mount Lemmon || Mount Lemmon Survey || — || align=right | 3.0 km || 
|-id=200 bgcolor=#d6d6d6
| 482200 ||  || — || November 5, 2010 || Mount Lemmon || Mount Lemmon Survey || EOS || align=right | 1.7 km || 
|}

482201–482300 

|-bgcolor=#d6d6d6
| 482201 ||  || — || October 30, 2010 || Kitt Peak || Spacewatch || — || align=right | 2.7 km || 
|-id=202 bgcolor=#d6d6d6
| 482202 ||  || — || December 27, 2005 || Kitt Peak || Spacewatch || — || align=right | 3.0 km || 
|-id=203 bgcolor=#d6d6d6
| 482203 ||  || — || October 29, 2010 || Kitt Peak || Spacewatch || — || align=right | 3.1 km || 
|-id=204 bgcolor=#d6d6d6
| 482204 ||  || — || March 14, 2007 || Mount Lemmon || Mount Lemmon Survey || — || align=right | 3.1 km || 
|-id=205 bgcolor=#d6d6d6
| 482205 ||  || — || November 10, 2010 || Mount Lemmon || Mount Lemmon Survey || — || align=right | 3.3 km || 
|-id=206 bgcolor=#d6d6d6
| 482206 ||  || — || October 17, 2010 || Mount Lemmon || Mount Lemmon Survey || TIR || align=right | 2.8 km || 
|-id=207 bgcolor=#d6d6d6
| 482207 ||  || — || November 11, 2010 || Mount Lemmon || Mount Lemmon Survey || — || align=right | 2.4 km || 
|-id=208 bgcolor=#d6d6d6
| 482208 ||  || — || November 9, 1999 || Socorro || LINEAR || Tj (2.97) || align=right | 2.8 km || 
|-id=209 bgcolor=#d6d6d6
| 482209 ||  || — || July 23, 2010 || WISE || WISE || — || align=right | 3.4 km || 
|-id=210 bgcolor=#d6d6d6
| 482210 ||  || — || September 18, 2010 || Mount Lemmon || Mount Lemmon Survey || — || align=right | 2.5 km || 
|-id=211 bgcolor=#d6d6d6
| 482211 ||  || — || October 30, 2005 || Mount Lemmon || Mount Lemmon Survey || EOS || align=right | 2.1 km || 
|-id=212 bgcolor=#d6d6d6
| 482212 ||  || — || October 6, 2004 || Kitt Peak || Spacewatch || — || align=right | 3.1 km || 
|-id=213 bgcolor=#d6d6d6
| 482213 ||  || — || November 16, 2010 || Mount Lemmon || Mount Lemmon Survey || — || align=right | 3.0 km || 
|-id=214 bgcolor=#d6d6d6
| 482214 ||  || — || November 11, 2010 || Mount Lemmon || Mount Lemmon Survey || — || align=right | 3.0 km || 
|-id=215 bgcolor=#d6d6d6
| 482215 ||  || — || October 30, 2010 || Kitt Peak || Spacewatch || LIX || align=right | 2.8 km || 
|-id=216 bgcolor=#d6d6d6
| 482216 ||  || — || December 26, 2005 || Mount Lemmon || Mount Lemmon Survey || — || align=right | 2.8 km || 
|-id=217 bgcolor=#d6d6d6
| 482217 ||  || — || October 14, 2010 || Mount Lemmon || Mount Lemmon Survey || — || align=right | 3.3 km || 
|-id=218 bgcolor=#d6d6d6
| 482218 ||  || — || November 7, 2010 || Catalina || CSS || Tj (2.99) || align=right | 4.3 km || 
|-id=219 bgcolor=#d6d6d6
| 482219 ||  || — || November 29, 2005 || Kitt Peak || Spacewatch || — || align=right | 3.3 km || 
|-id=220 bgcolor=#d6d6d6
| 482220 ||  || — || November 12, 2010 || Kitt Peak || Spacewatch || Tj (2.99) || align=right | 4.1 km || 
|-id=221 bgcolor=#d6d6d6
| 482221 ||  || — || November 6, 2010 || Catalina || CSS || — || align=right | 4.2 km || 
|-id=222 bgcolor=#d6d6d6
| 482222 ||  || — || October 10, 2004 || Kitt Peak || Spacewatch || — || align=right | 2.1 km || 
|-id=223 bgcolor=#d6d6d6
| 482223 ||  || — || January 2, 2006 || Catalina || CSS || — || align=right | 3.2 km || 
|-id=224 bgcolor=#d6d6d6
| 482224 ||  || — || December 10, 2010 || Mount Lemmon || Mount Lemmon Survey || — || align=right | 3.1 km || 
|-id=225 bgcolor=#d6d6d6
| 482225 ||  || — || October 7, 2004 || Kitt Peak || Spacewatch || — || align=right | 2.6 km || 
|-id=226 bgcolor=#d6d6d6
| 482226 ||  || — || May 24, 2006 || Kitt Peak || Spacewatch || SYL7:4 || align=right | 5.5 km || 
|-id=227 bgcolor=#fefefe
| 482227 ||  || — || September 28, 2006 || Kitt Peak || Spacewatch || — || align=right data-sort-value="0.71" | 710 m || 
|-id=228 bgcolor=#FFC2E0
| 482228 ||  || — || January 22, 2011 || Mount Lemmon || Mount Lemmon Survey || APO +1km || align=right data-sort-value="0.90" | 900 m || 
|-id=229 bgcolor=#fefefe
| 482229 ||  || — || December 7, 2010 || Mount Lemmon || Mount Lemmon Survey || H || align=right data-sort-value="0.73" | 730 m || 
|-id=230 bgcolor=#d6d6d6
| 482230 ||  || — || January 27, 2011 || Mount Lemmon || Mount Lemmon Survey || — || align=right | 2.7 km || 
|-id=231 bgcolor=#fefefe
| 482231 ||  || — || November 21, 2006 || Mount Lemmon || Mount Lemmon Survey || — || align=right data-sort-value="0.89" | 890 m || 
|-id=232 bgcolor=#fefefe
| 482232 ||  || — || January 27, 2011 || Mount Lemmon || Mount Lemmon Survey || — || align=right data-sort-value="0.70" | 700 m || 
|-id=233 bgcolor=#d6d6d6
| 482233 ||  || — || October 6, 2008 || Mount Lemmon || Mount Lemmon Survey || Tj (2.99) || align=right | 4.3 km || 
|-id=234 bgcolor=#FFC2E0
| 482234 ||  || — || January 28, 2011 || Catalina || CSS || AMO || align=right data-sort-value="0.11" | 110 m || 
|-id=235 bgcolor=#fefefe
| 482235 ||  || — || September 22, 2003 || Kitt Peak || Spacewatch || — || align=right data-sort-value="0.47" | 470 m || 
|-id=236 bgcolor=#fefefe
| 482236 ||  || — || September 1, 2005 || Kitt Peak || Spacewatch || — || align=right data-sort-value="0.77" | 770 m || 
|-id=237 bgcolor=#fefefe
| 482237 ||  || — || March 2, 2011 || Kitt Peak || Spacewatch || — || align=right data-sort-value="0.78" | 780 m || 
|-id=238 bgcolor=#fefefe
| 482238 ||  || — || March 25, 2011 || Catalina || CSS || — || align=right data-sort-value="0.71" | 710 m || 
|-id=239 bgcolor=#fefefe
| 482239 ||  || — || November 26, 2009 || Kitt Peak || Spacewatch || — || align=right data-sort-value="0.89" | 890 m || 
|-id=240 bgcolor=#fefefe
| 482240 ||  || — || March 11, 2011 || Kitt Peak || Spacewatch || — || align=right data-sort-value="0.81" | 810 m || 
|-id=241 bgcolor=#fefefe
| 482241 ||  || — || November 10, 2009 || Kitt Peak || Spacewatch || — || align=right data-sort-value="0.78" | 780 m || 
|-id=242 bgcolor=#fefefe
| 482242 ||  || — || March 12, 2011 || Mount Lemmon || Mount Lemmon Survey || — || align=right data-sort-value="0.74" | 740 m || 
|-id=243 bgcolor=#fefefe
| 482243 ||  || — || April 13, 2011 || Kitt Peak || Spacewatch || — || align=right data-sort-value="0.89" | 890 m || 
|-id=244 bgcolor=#FFC2E0
| 482244 ||  || — || April 24, 2011 || Haleakala || Pan-STARRS || AMO || align=right data-sort-value="0.38" | 380 m || 
|-id=245 bgcolor=#fefefe
| 482245 ||  || — || March 19, 2007 || Mount Lemmon || Mount Lemmon Survey || — || align=right data-sort-value="0.90" | 900 m || 
|-id=246 bgcolor=#fefefe
| 482246 ||  || — || March 27, 2011 || Kitt Peak || Spacewatch || — || align=right data-sort-value="0.71" | 710 m || 
|-id=247 bgcolor=#fefefe
| 482247 ||  || — || March 8, 2011 || Kitt Peak || Spacewatch || — || align=right data-sort-value="0.68" | 680 m || 
|-id=248 bgcolor=#fefefe
| 482248 ||  || — || April 11, 2011 || Mount Lemmon || Mount Lemmon Survey || — || align=right data-sort-value="0.70" | 700 m || 
|-id=249 bgcolor=#C2FFFF
| 482249 ||  || — || April 19, 2010 || WISE || WISE || L5 || align=right | 10 km || 
|-id=250 bgcolor=#FFC2E0
| 482250 ||  || — || June 5, 2011 || Catalina || CSS || AMOPHAfast?critical || align=right data-sort-value="0.37" | 370 m || 
|-id=251 bgcolor=#E9E9E9
| 482251 ||  || — || June 4, 2011 || Mount Lemmon || Mount Lemmon Survey || — || align=right | 1.7 km || 
|-id=252 bgcolor=#FA8072
| 482252 ||  || — || January 15, 2004 || Kitt Peak || Spacewatch || — || align=right | 2.5 km || 
|-id=253 bgcolor=#E9E9E9
| 482253 ||  || — || September 13, 2007 || Catalina || CSS || — || align=right | 1.2 km || 
|-id=254 bgcolor=#E9E9E9
| 482254 ||  || — || October 8, 2007 || Catalina || CSS || — || align=right | 1.4 km || 
|-id=255 bgcolor=#E9E9E9
| 482255 ||  || — || June 17, 2010 || WISE || WISE || — || align=right | 2.3 km || 
|-id=256 bgcolor=#E9E9E9
| 482256 ||  || — || June 30, 2011 || Siding Spring || SSS || — || align=right | 2.1 km || 
|-id=257 bgcolor=#E9E9E9
| 482257 ||  || — || September 5, 2007 || Anderson Mesa || LONEOS || — || align=right | 1.8 km || 
|-id=258 bgcolor=#E9E9E9
| 482258 ||  || — || June 7, 2011 || Mount Lemmon || Mount Lemmon Survey || JUN || align=right data-sort-value="0.95" | 950 m || 
|-id=259 bgcolor=#E9E9E9
| 482259 ||  || — || October 24, 2007 || Mount Lemmon || Mount Lemmon Survey || — || align=right | 1.7 km || 
|-id=260 bgcolor=#E9E9E9
| 482260 ||  || — || October 8, 2007 || Catalina || CSS || — || align=right | 1.9 km || 
|-id=261 bgcolor=#E9E9E9
| 482261 ||  || — || October 20, 2007 || Mount Lemmon || Mount Lemmon Survey || AST || align=right | 1.7 km || 
|-id=262 bgcolor=#E9E9E9
| 482262 ||  || — || October 8, 2007 || Catalina || CSS || — || align=right | 1.8 km || 
|-id=263 bgcolor=#E9E9E9
| 482263 ||  || — || November 19, 2007 || Mount Lemmon || Mount Lemmon Survey || DOR || align=right | 2.0 km || 
|-id=264 bgcolor=#E9E9E9
| 482264 ||  || — || March 13, 2010 || Kitt Peak || Spacewatch || — || align=right | 1.3 km || 
|-id=265 bgcolor=#E9E9E9
| 482265 ||  || — || October 5, 2002 || Kitt Peak || Spacewatch ||  || align=right | 1.5 km || 
|-id=266 bgcolor=#C2FFFF
| 482266 ||  || — || March 13, 2008 || Kitt Peak || Spacewatch || L5 || align=right | 7.4 km || 
|-id=267 bgcolor=#E9E9E9
| 482267 ||  || — || December 19, 2004 || Kitt Peak || Spacewatch || EUN || align=right | 1.2 km || 
|-id=268 bgcolor=#E9E9E9
| 482268 ||  || — || October 1, 2002 || Anderson Mesa || LONEOS || — || align=right | 2.3 km || 
|-id=269 bgcolor=#E9E9E9
| 482269 ||  || — || January 18, 2009 || Kitt Peak || Spacewatch || — || align=right | 2.3 km || 
|-id=270 bgcolor=#E9E9E9
| 482270 ||  || — || November 3, 2007 || Kitt Peak || Spacewatch || — || align=right | 1.0 km || 
|-id=271 bgcolor=#E9E9E9
| 482271 ||  || — || December 30, 2007 || Mount Lemmon || Mount Lemmon Survey || — || align=right | 1.8 km || 
|-id=272 bgcolor=#E9E9E9
| 482272 ||  || — || November 4, 2007 || Kitt Peak || Spacewatch || NEM || align=right | 1.7 km || 
|-id=273 bgcolor=#d6d6d6
| 482273 ||  || — || October 14, 2007 || Mount Lemmon || Mount Lemmon Survey || — || align=right | 3.6 km || 
|-id=274 bgcolor=#E9E9E9
| 482274 ||  || — || April 8, 2010 || Kitt Peak || Spacewatch || — || align=right | 2.1 km || 
|-id=275 bgcolor=#E9E9E9
| 482275 ||  || — || September 23, 2011 || Kitt Peak || Spacewatch || JUN || align=right | 1.0 km || 
|-id=276 bgcolor=#E9E9E9
| 482276 ||  || — || October 1, 2002 || Anderson Mesa || LONEOS || GEF || align=right | 1.1 km || 
|-id=277 bgcolor=#E9E9E9
| 482277 ||  || — || September 21, 2011 || Kitt Peak || Spacewatch || EUN || align=right | 1.2 km || 
|-id=278 bgcolor=#E9E9E9
| 482278 ||  || — || September 20, 2011 || Kitt Peak || Spacewatch || — || align=right | 1.4 km || 
|-id=279 bgcolor=#E9E9E9
| 482279 ||  || — || September 21, 2011 || Catalina || CSS || — || align=right | 1.4 km || 
|-id=280 bgcolor=#E9E9E9
| 482280 ||  || — || September 26, 2011 || Mount Lemmon || Mount Lemmon Survey || — || align=right | 1.4 km || 
|-id=281 bgcolor=#E9E9E9
| 482281 ||  || — || September 21, 2011 || Kitt Peak || Spacewatch || DOR || align=right | 2.2 km || 
|-id=282 bgcolor=#E9E9E9
| 482282 ||  || — || March 2, 2009 || Mount Lemmon || Mount Lemmon Survey || — || align=right | 1.0 km || 
|-id=283 bgcolor=#E9E9E9
| 482283 ||  || — || November 5, 2007 || Mount Lemmon || Mount Lemmon Survey || — || align=right | 2.0 km || 
|-id=284 bgcolor=#E9E9E9
| 482284 ||  || — || September 29, 2011 || Kitt Peak || Spacewatch || EUN || align=right | 1.1 km || 
|-id=285 bgcolor=#E9E9E9
| 482285 ||  || — || August 21, 2006 || Kitt Peak || Spacewatch || — || align=right | 1.9 km || 
|-id=286 bgcolor=#E9E9E9
| 482286 ||  || — || September 15, 2006 || Kitt Peak || Spacewatch || HOF || align=right | 2.1 km || 
|-id=287 bgcolor=#E9E9E9
| 482287 ||  || — || September 23, 2011 || Mount Lemmon || Mount Lemmon Survey || — || align=right | 1.8 km || 
|-id=288 bgcolor=#E9E9E9
| 482288 ||  || — || September 20, 2011 || Kitt Peak || Spacewatch || — || align=right data-sort-value="0.78" | 780 m || 
|-id=289 bgcolor=#E9E9E9
| 482289 ||  || — || September 22, 2011 || Catalina || CSS || EUN || align=right | 1.3 km || 
|-id=290 bgcolor=#E9E9E9
| 482290 ||  || — || September 26, 2011 || Kitt Peak || Spacewatch || — || align=right | 1.9 km || 
|-id=291 bgcolor=#fefefe
| 482291 ||  || — || September 23, 2011 || Kitt Peak || Spacewatch || — || align=right data-sort-value="0.62" | 620 m || 
|-id=292 bgcolor=#E9E9E9
| 482292 ||  || — || March 18, 2009 || Kitt Peak || Spacewatch || EUN || align=right | 1.3 km || 
|-id=293 bgcolor=#E9E9E9
| 482293 ||  || — || September 7, 2011 || Kitt Peak || Spacewatch || — || align=right | 2.2 km || 
|-id=294 bgcolor=#E9E9E9
| 482294 ||  || — || September 21, 2011 || Catalina || CSS || — || align=right | 2.4 km || 
|-id=295 bgcolor=#E9E9E9
| 482295 ||  || — || September 21, 2011 || Catalina || CSS || — || align=right | 1.8 km || 
|-id=296 bgcolor=#d6d6d6
| 482296 ||  || — || October 16, 2011 || Kitt Peak || Spacewatch || HYG || align=right | 2.9 km || 
|-id=297 bgcolor=#E9E9E9
| 482297 ||  || — || December 21, 2007 || Mount Lemmon || Mount Lemmon Survey || — || align=right | 2.1 km || 
|-id=298 bgcolor=#d6d6d6
| 482298 ||  || — || October 18, 2011 || Kitt Peak || Spacewatch || — || align=right | 2.4 km || 
|-id=299 bgcolor=#d6d6d6
| 482299 ||  || — || September 22, 2011 || Kitt Peak || Spacewatch || — || align=right | 2.4 km || 
|-id=300 bgcolor=#E9E9E9
| 482300 ||  || — || January 11, 2008 || Kitt Peak || Spacewatch || AEO || align=right data-sort-value="0.95" | 950 m || 
|}

482301–482400 

|-bgcolor=#E9E9E9
| 482301 ||  || — || October 20, 2011 || Mount Lemmon || Mount Lemmon Survey || HOF || align=right | 2.5 km || 
|-id=302 bgcolor=#d6d6d6
| 482302 ||  || — || October 21, 2006 || Kitt Peak || Spacewatch || BRAcritical || align=right | 1.3 km || 
|-id=303 bgcolor=#E9E9E9
| 482303 ||  || — || August 28, 2006 || Kitt Peak || Spacewatch || HOF || align=right | 2.0 km || 
|-id=304 bgcolor=#E9E9E9
| 482304 ||  || — || October 19, 2011 || Mount Lemmon || Mount Lemmon Survey || — || align=right | 2.2 km || 
|-id=305 bgcolor=#E9E9E9
| 482305 ||  || — || August 21, 2006 || Kitt Peak || Spacewatch || — || align=right | 1.7 km || 
|-id=306 bgcolor=#d6d6d6
| 482306 ||  || — || October 20, 2011 || Kitt Peak || Spacewatch || EOS || align=right | 2.2 km || 
|-id=307 bgcolor=#E9E9E9
| 482307 ||  || — || October 20, 2011 || Kitt Peak || Spacewatch || JUN || align=right data-sort-value="0.87" | 870 m || 
|-id=308 bgcolor=#E9E9E9
| 482308 ||  || — || November 3, 2007 || Kitt Peak || Spacewatch || — || align=right | 1.0 km || 
|-id=309 bgcolor=#d6d6d6
| 482309 ||  || — || October 24, 2011 || Kitt Peak || Spacewatch || EOS || align=right | 1.8 km || 
|-id=310 bgcolor=#E9E9E9
| 482310 ||  || — || October 23, 2011 || Kitt Peak || Spacewatch || — || align=right | 1.0 km || 
|-id=311 bgcolor=#d6d6d6
| 482311 ||  || — || April 6, 1999 || Kitt Peak || Spacewatch || — || align=right | 1.9 km || 
|-id=312 bgcolor=#E9E9E9
| 482312 ||  || — || September 20, 2011 || Mount Lemmon || Mount Lemmon Survey || EUN || align=right | 1.3 km || 
|-id=313 bgcolor=#E9E9E9
| 482313 ||  || — || October 25, 2011 || XuYi || PMO NEO || — || align=right | 1.5 km || 
|-id=314 bgcolor=#E9E9E9
| 482314 ||  || — || February 23, 2010 || WISE || WISE || — || align=right | 3.7 km || 
|-id=315 bgcolor=#E9E9E9
| 482315 ||  || — || September 26, 2011 || Kitt Peak || Spacewatch || — || align=right | 1.9 km || 
|-id=316 bgcolor=#E9E9E9
| 482316 ||  || — || March 15, 2004 || Kitt Peak || Spacewatch || AEO || align=right | 1.2 km || 
|-id=317 bgcolor=#E9E9E9
| 482317 ||  || — || September 22, 2011 || Mount Lemmon || Mount Lemmon Survey || — || align=right | 1.6 km || 
|-id=318 bgcolor=#E9E9E9
| 482318 ||  || — || October 22, 2011 || Kitt Peak || Spacewatch || — || align=right | 1.9 km || 
|-id=319 bgcolor=#d6d6d6
| 482319 ||  || — || September 26, 2006 || Mount Lemmon || Mount Lemmon Survey || — || align=right | 1.9 km || 
|-id=320 bgcolor=#d6d6d6
| 482320 ||  || — || October 22, 2011 || Kitt Peak || Spacewatch || EOS || align=right | 1.8 km || 
|-id=321 bgcolor=#E9E9E9
| 482321 ||  || — || October 2, 2006 || Mount Lemmon || Mount Lemmon Survey || — || align=right | 1.9 km || 
|-id=322 bgcolor=#E9E9E9
| 482322 ||  || — || September 26, 2006 || Kitt Peak || Spacewatch || — || align=right | 1.7 km || 
|-id=323 bgcolor=#E9E9E9
| 482323 ||  || — || October 22, 2011 || Kitt Peak || Spacewatch || — || align=right | 2.1 km || 
|-id=324 bgcolor=#d6d6d6
| 482324 ||  || — || October 13, 2006 || Kitt Peak || Spacewatch || — || align=right | 1.6 km || 
|-id=325 bgcolor=#E9E9E9
| 482325 ||  || — || October 21, 2011 || Mount Lemmon || Mount Lemmon Survey || — || align=right | 2.2 km || 
|-id=326 bgcolor=#E9E9E9
| 482326 ||  || — || November 19, 2003 || Kitt Peak || Spacewatch || KON || align=right | 1.7 km || 
|-id=327 bgcolor=#E9E9E9
| 482327 ||  || — || October 28, 2011 || Kitt Peak || Spacewatch || — || align=right | 1.9 km || 
|-id=328 bgcolor=#d6d6d6
| 482328 ||  || — || October 21, 2011 || Kitt Peak || Spacewatch || — || align=right | 1.9 km || 
|-id=329 bgcolor=#E9E9E9
| 482329 ||  || — || November 7, 2002 || Socorro || LINEAR || — || align=right | 1.8 km || 
|-id=330 bgcolor=#d6d6d6
| 482330 ||  || — || November 12, 2006 || Mount Lemmon || Mount Lemmon Survey || — || align=right | 2.0 km || 
|-id=331 bgcolor=#E9E9E9
| 482331 ||  || — || October 22, 2011 || Kitt Peak || Spacewatch || — || align=right | 2.8 km || 
|-id=332 bgcolor=#E9E9E9
| 482332 ||  || — || October 23, 2011 || Kitt Peak || Spacewatch || — || align=right | 2.5 km || 
|-id=333 bgcolor=#E9E9E9
| 482333 ||  || — || September 21, 2011 || Kitt Peak || Spacewatch || — || align=right | 2.6 km || 
|-id=334 bgcolor=#E9E9E9
| 482334 ||  || — || January 16, 2008 || Mount Lemmon || Mount Lemmon Survey || — || align=right | 2.2 km || 
|-id=335 bgcolor=#E9E9E9
| 482335 ||  || — || December 14, 2007 || Mount Lemmon || Mount Lemmon Survey || — || align=right | 2.0 km || 
|-id=336 bgcolor=#E9E9E9
| 482336 ||  || — || March 28, 2009 || Kitt Peak || Spacewatch || — || align=right | 2.1 km || 
|-id=337 bgcolor=#E9E9E9
| 482337 ||  || — || October 21, 2006 || Kitt Peak || Spacewatch || — || align=right | 1.4 km || 
|-id=338 bgcolor=#E9E9E9
| 482338 ||  || — || December 31, 2002 || Socorro || LINEAR ||  || align=right | 2.8 km || 
|-id=339 bgcolor=#fefefe
| 482339 ||  || — || November 12, 2006 || Mount Lemmon || Mount Lemmon Survey || H || align=right data-sort-value="0.52" | 520 m || 
|-id=340 bgcolor=#E9E9E9
| 482340 ||  || — || September 28, 2006 || Kitt Peak || Spacewatch || — || align=right | 1.7 km || 
|-id=341 bgcolor=#E9E9E9
| 482341 ||  || — || October 20, 2011 || Kitt Peak || Spacewatch || — || align=right | 1.6 km || 
|-id=342 bgcolor=#d6d6d6
| 482342 ||  || — || October 21, 2006 || Mount Lemmon || Mount Lemmon Survey || — || align=right | 2.3 km || 
|-id=343 bgcolor=#d6d6d6
| 482343 ||  || — || October 21, 2011 || Mount Lemmon || Mount Lemmon Survey || — || align=right | 2.1 km || 
|-id=344 bgcolor=#FFC2E0
| 482344 ||  || — || November 22, 2011 || Haleakala || Pan-STARRS || APOPHA || align=right data-sort-value="0.41" | 410 m || 
|-id=345 bgcolor=#d6d6d6
| 482345 ||  || — || May 12, 2010 || WISE || WISE || — || align=right | 3.3 km || 
|-id=346 bgcolor=#E9E9E9
| 482346 ||  || — || November 17, 2007 || Catalina || CSS || — || align=right | 1.5 km || 
|-id=347 bgcolor=#d6d6d6
| 482347 ||  || — || November 23, 2006 || Kitt Peak || Spacewatch || KOR || align=right | 1.1 km || 
|-id=348 bgcolor=#E9E9E9
| 482348 ||  || — || November 2, 2011 || Mount Lemmon || Mount Lemmon Survey || — || align=right | 2.6 km || 
|-id=349 bgcolor=#d6d6d6
| 482349 ||  || — || December 16, 2006 || Kitt Peak || Spacewatch || EOS || align=right | 1.8 km || 
|-id=350 bgcolor=#d6d6d6
| 482350 ||  || — || January 13, 2002 || Kitt Peak || Spacewatch || — || align=right | 1.8 km || 
|-id=351 bgcolor=#E9E9E9
| 482351 ||  || — || January 14, 2008 || Kitt Peak || Spacewatch || — || align=right | 2.7 km || 
|-id=352 bgcolor=#E9E9E9
| 482352 ||  || — || May 10, 2005 || Kitt Peak || Spacewatch || — || align=right | 1.9 km || 
|-id=353 bgcolor=#d6d6d6
| 482353 ||  || — || October 21, 2006 || Kitt Peak || Spacewatch || KOR || align=right | 1.2 km || 
|-id=354 bgcolor=#d6d6d6
| 482354 ||  || — || November 10, 2006 || Kitt Peak || Spacewatch || — || align=right | 2.0 km || 
|-id=355 bgcolor=#d6d6d6
| 482355 ||  || — || October 24, 2011 || Mount Lemmon || Mount Lemmon Survey || — || align=right | 3.0 km || 
|-id=356 bgcolor=#d6d6d6
| 482356 ||  || — || October 23, 2011 || Kitt Peak || Spacewatch || — || align=right | 3.2 km || 
|-id=357 bgcolor=#d6d6d6
| 482357 ||  || — || October 2, 2006 || Mount Lemmon || Mount Lemmon Survey || — || align=right | 1.5 km || 
|-id=358 bgcolor=#d6d6d6
| 482358 ||  || — || November 18, 2011 || Mount Lemmon || Mount Lemmon Survey || — || align=right | 2.9 km || 
|-id=359 bgcolor=#E9E9E9
| 482359 ||  || — || July 29, 2006 || Siding Spring || SSS || — || align=right | 2.5 km || 
|-id=360 bgcolor=#E9E9E9
| 482360 ||  || — || October 27, 2011 || Mount Lemmon || Mount Lemmon Survey || — || align=right | 2.7 km || 
|-id=361 bgcolor=#E9E9E9
| 482361 ||  || — || February 19, 2004 || Socorro || LINEAR || EUN || align=right | 1.3 km || 
|-id=362 bgcolor=#E9E9E9
| 482362 ||  || — || August 21, 2006 || Kitt Peak || Spacewatch || — || align=right | 1.4 km || 
|-id=363 bgcolor=#d6d6d6
| 482363 ||  || — || July 3, 2005 || Mount Lemmon || Mount Lemmon Survey || — || align=right | 2.4 km || 
|-id=364 bgcolor=#d6d6d6
| 482364 ||  || — || October 1, 2005 || Catalina || CSS || EOS || align=right | 1.8 km || 
|-id=365 bgcolor=#d6d6d6
| 482365 ||  || — || December 24, 2011 || Mount Lemmon || Mount Lemmon Survey || — || align=right | 3.0 km || 
|-id=366 bgcolor=#d6d6d6
| 482366 ||  || — || May 3, 2008 || Kitt Peak || Spacewatch || — || align=right | 2.8 km || 
|-id=367 bgcolor=#d6d6d6
| 482367 ||  || — || March 13, 2007 || Catalina || CSS || — || align=right | 3.4 km || 
|-id=368 bgcolor=#d6d6d6
| 482368 ||  || — || November 28, 2011 || Mount Lemmon || Mount Lemmon Survey || — || align=right | 3.5 km || 
|-id=369 bgcolor=#d6d6d6
| 482369 ||  || — || December 27, 2011 || Mount Lemmon || Mount Lemmon Survey || — || align=right | 3.4 km || 
|-id=370 bgcolor=#d6d6d6
| 482370 ||  || — || November 27, 2011 || Mount Lemmon || Mount Lemmon Survey || — || align=right | 3.2 km || 
|-id=371 bgcolor=#d6d6d6
| 482371 ||  || — || August 8, 2010 || WISE || WISE || URS || align=right | 4.7 km || 
|-id=372 bgcolor=#d6d6d6
| 482372 ||  || — || April 22, 2002 || Kitt Peak || Spacewatch || — || align=right | 2.7 km || 
|-id=373 bgcolor=#d6d6d6
| 482373 ||  || — || December 27, 2011 || Kitt Peak || Spacewatch || — || align=right | 2.9 km || 
|-id=374 bgcolor=#fefefe
| 482374 ||  || — || December 27, 2011 || Kitt Peak || Spacewatch || H || align=right data-sort-value="0.86" | 860 m || 
|-id=375 bgcolor=#d6d6d6
| 482375 ||  || — || July 18, 2010 || WISE || WISE || — || align=right | 3.5 km || 
|-id=376 bgcolor=#d6d6d6
| 482376 ||  || — || November 25, 2005 || Catalina || CSS || — || align=right | 2.9 km || 
|-id=377 bgcolor=#d6d6d6
| 482377 ||  || — || July 11, 2010 || WISE || WISE || LIX || align=right | 4.5 km || 
|-id=378 bgcolor=#fefefe
| 482378 ||  || — || December 27, 2011 || Mount Lemmon || Mount Lemmon Survey || H || align=right data-sort-value="0.70" | 700 m || 
|-id=379 bgcolor=#fefefe
| 482379 ||  || — || December 28, 2011 || Mount Lemmon || Mount Lemmon Survey || H || align=right data-sort-value="0.75" | 750 m || 
|-id=380 bgcolor=#d6d6d6
| 482380 ||  || — || December 27, 2005 || Kitt Peak || Spacewatch || Tj (2.99) || align=right | 3.6 km || 
|-id=381 bgcolor=#d6d6d6
| 482381 ||  || — || October 11, 2010 || Mount Lemmon || Mount Lemmon Survey || — || align=right | 2.7 km || 
|-id=382 bgcolor=#d6d6d6
| 482382 ||  || — || May 15, 2008 || Mount Lemmon || Mount Lemmon Survey || — || align=right | 4.0 km || 
|-id=383 bgcolor=#d6d6d6
| 482383 ||  || — || January 1, 2012 || Mount Lemmon || Mount Lemmon Survey || — || align=right | 3.1 km || 
|-id=384 bgcolor=#d6d6d6
| 482384 ||  || — || November 4, 2010 || Mount Lemmon || Mount Lemmon Survey || — || align=right | 3.7 km || 
|-id=385 bgcolor=#d6d6d6
| 482385 ||  || — || October 1, 2005 || Kitt Peak || Spacewatch || — || align=right | 2.2 km || 
|-id=386 bgcolor=#d6d6d6
| 482386 ||  || — || November 27, 2011 || Mount Lemmon || Mount Lemmon Survey || URS || align=right | 3.5 km || 
|-id=387 bgcolor=#d6d6d6
| 482387 ||  || — || August 1, 2010 || WISE || WISE || — || align=right | 4.3 km || 
|-id=388 bgcolor=#fefefe
| 482388 ||  || — || December 24, 2006 || Mount Lemmon || Mount Lemmon Survey || H || align=right data-sort-value="0.74" | 740 m || 
|-id=389 bgcolor=#fefefe
| 482389 ||  || — || January 23, 2004 || Socorro || LINEAR || H || align=right data-sort-value="0.81" | 810 m || 
|-id=390 bgcolor=#d6d6d6
| 482390 ||  || — || December 25, 2011 || Kitt Peak || Spacewatch || — || align=right | 3.1 km || 
|-id=391 bgcolor=#FFC2E0
| 482391 ||  || — || January 1, 2012 || Mount Lemmon || Mount Lemmon Survey || AMO || align=right data-sort-value="0.56" | 560 m || 
|-id=392 bgcolor=#d6d6d6
| 482392 ||  || — || May 7, 2008 || Mount Lemmon || Mount Lemmon Survey || VER || align=right | 3.1 km || 
|-id=393 bgcolor=#d6d6d6
| 482393 ||  || — || October 7, 2010 || Catalina || CSS || — || align=right | 2.7 km || 
|-id=394 bgcolor=#fefefe
| 482394 ||  || — || December 29, 2003 || Socorro || LINEAR || H || align=right data-sort-value="0.77" | 770 m || 
|-id=395 bgcolor=#d6d6d6
| 482395 ||  || — || January 18, 2012 || Kitt Peak || Spacewatch || — || align=right | 2.5 km || 
|-id=396 bgcolor=#d6d6d6
| 482396 ||  || — || October 29, 2005 || Mount Lemmon || Mount Lemmon Survey || — || align=right | 2.7 km || 
|-id=397 bgcolor=#d6d6d6
| 482397 ||  || — || April 6, 2008 || Mount Lemmon || Mount Lemmon Survey || EOS || align=right | 2.0 km || 
|-id=398 bgcolor=#d6d6d6
| 482398 ||  || — || December 1, 2005 || Kitt Peak || Spacewatch || — || align=right | 3.4 km || 
|-id=399 bgcolor=#d6d6d6
| 482399 ||  || — || January 25, 2007 || Catalina || CSS || — || align=right | 2.4 km || 
|-id=400 bgcolor=#d6d6d6
| 482400 ||  || — || December 28, 2011 || Kitt Peak || Spacewatch || EOS || align=right | 1.9 km || 
|}

482401–482500 

|-bgcolor=#FA8072
| 482401 ||  || — || December 17, 2003 || Socorro || LINEAR || H || align=right data-sort-value="0.68" | 680 m || 
|-id=402 bgcolor=#d6d6d6
| 482402 ||  || — || December 29, 2011 || Mount Lemmon || Mount Lemmon Survey || — || align=right | 3.1 km || 
|-id=403 bgcolor=#d6d6d6
| 482403 ||  || — || December 26, 2011 || Kitt Peak || Spacewatch || EOS || align=right | 1.8 km || 
|-id=404 bgcolor=#d6d6d6
| 482404 ||  || — || December 25, 2005 || Kitt Peak || Spacewatch || — || align=right | 2.4 km || 
|-id=405 bgcolor=#d6d6d6
| 482405 ||  || — || December 30, 2011 || Kitt Peak || Spacewatch || — || align=right | 2.7 km || 
|-id=406 bgcolor=#d6d6d6
| 482406 ||  || — || December 1, 2005 || Catalina || CSS || — || align=right | 2.6 km || 
|-id=407 bgcolor=#d6d6d6
| 482407 ||  || — || January 21, 2012 || Kitt Peak || Spacewatch || — || align=right | 4.2 km || 
|-id=408 bgcolor=#d6d6d6
| 482408 ||  || — || February 16, 2007 || Mount Lemmon || Mount Lemmon Survey || — || align=right | 2.5 km || 
|-id=409 bgcolor=#d6d6d6
| 482409 ||  || — || March 15, 2007 || Catalina || CSS || — || align=right | 3.7 km || 
|-id=410 bgcolor=#d6d6d6
| 482410 ||  || — || October 14, 2010 || Mount Lemmon || Mount Lemmon Survey || — || align=right | 2.6 km || 
|-id=411 bgcolor=#d6d6d6
| 482411 ||  || — || January 1, 2012 || Mount Lemmon || Mount Lemmon Survey || — || align=right | 3.1 km || 
|-id=412 bgcolor=#fefefe
| 482412 ||  || — || January 19, 2012 || Catalina || CSS || H || align=right data-sort-value="0.73" | 730 m || 
|-id=413 bgcolor=#d6d6d6
| 482413 ||  || — || December 25, 2005 || Kitt Peak || Spacewatch || — || align=right | 2.5 km || 
|-id=414 bgcolor=#d6d6d6
| 482414 ||  || — || January 18, 2012 || Kitt Peak || Spacewatch || — || align=right | 1.9 km || 
|-id=415 bgcolor=#d6d6d6
| 482415 ||  || — || November 5, 2010 || Mount Lemmon || Mount Lemmon Survey || — || align=right | 2.8 km || 
|-id=416 bgcolor=#d6d6d6
| 482416 ||  || — || December 10, 2005 || Kitt Peak || Spacewatch || — || align=right | 3.2 km || 
|-id=417 bgcolor=#d6d6d6
| 482417 ||  || — || January 27, 2012 || Kitt Peak || Spacewatch || — || align=right | 2.5 km || 
|-id=418 bgcolor=#d6d6d6
| 482418 ||  || — || October 31, 2010 || Mount Lemmon || Mount Lemmon Survey || EOS || align=right | 2.0 km || 
|-id=419 bgcolor=#d6d6d6
| 482419 ||  || — || January 20, 2012 || Kitt Peak || Spacewatch || — || align=right | 3.8 km || 
|-id=420 bgcolor=#d6d6d6
| 482420 ||  || — || October 27, 2005 || Catalina || CSS || — || align=right | 2.9 km || 
|-id=421 bgcolor=#d6d6d6
| 482421 ||  || — || August 1, 2010 || WISE || WISE || — || align=right | 4.5 km || 
|-id=422 bgcolor=#d6d6d6
| 482422 ||  || — || December 5, 2005 || Kitt Peak || Spacewatch || THM || align=right | 2.2 km || 
|-id=423 bgcolor=#d6d6d6
| 482423 ||  || — || December 30, 2005 || Kitt Peak || Spacewatch || THM || align=right | 2.1 km || 
|-id=424 bgcolor=#d6d6d6
| 482424 ||  || — || October 4, 2004 || Kitt Peak || Spacewatch || — || align=right | 3.1 km || 
|-id=425 bgcolor=#d6d6d6
| 482425 ||  || — || February 17, 2007 || Mount Lemmon || Mount Lemmon Survey || — || align=right | 2.6 km || 
|-id=426 bgcolor=#d6d6d6
| 482426 ||  || — || February 2, 2001 || Kitt Peak || Spacewatch || — || align=right | 3.7 km || 
|-id=427 bgcolor=#d6d6d6
| 482427 ||  || — || March 14, 2007 || Mount Lemmon || Mount Lemmon Survey || EOS || align=right | 1.8 km || 
|-id=428 bgcolor=#d6d6d6
| 482428 ||  || — || August 17, 2009 || Kitt Peak || Spacewatch || — || align=right | 4.6 km || 
|-id=429 bgcolor=#d6d6d6
| 482429 ||  || — || January 5, 2006 || Catalina || CSS || — || align=right | 3.6 km || 
|-id=430 bgcolor=#d6d6d6
| 482430 ||  || — || June 30, 2010 || WISE || WISE || — || align=right | 2.6 km || 
|-id=431 bgcolor=#d6d6d6
| 482431 ||  || — || October 31, 2010 || Kitt Peak || Spacewatch || 7:4 || align=right | 3.9 km || 
|-id=432 bgcolor=#d6d6d6
| 482432 ||  || — || September 30, 2010 || Kitt Peak || Spacewatch || — || align=right | 2.4 km || 
|-id=433 bgcolor=#d6d6d6
| 482433 ||  || — || November 16, 2010 || Mount Lemmon || Mount Lemmon Survey || — || align=right | 2.9 km || 
|-id=434 bgcolor=#d6d6d6
| 482434 ||  || — || March 16, 2007 || Kitt Peak || Spacewatch || — || align=right | 2.8 km || 
|-id=435 bgcolor=#d6d6d6
| 482435 ||  || — || August 27, 2009 || Kitt Peak || Spacewatch || — || align=right | 3.2 km || 
|-id=436 bgcolor=#d6d6d6
| 482436 ||  || — || December 25, 2011 || Mount Lemmon || Mount Lemmon Survey || — || align=right | 2.5 km || 
|-id=437 bgcolor=#d6d6d6
| 482437 ||  || — || December 27, 2005 || Mount Lemmon || Mount Lemmon Survey || — || align=right | 2.5 km || 
|-id=438 bgcolor=#d6d6d6
| 482438 ||  || — || July 29, 2010 || WISE || WISE || — || align=right | 3.9 km || 
|-id=439 bgcolor=#fefefe
| 482439 ||  || — || February 13, 2004 || Kitt Peak || Spacewatch || H || align=right data-sort-value="0.71" | 710 m || 
|-id=440 bgcolor=#d6d6d6
| 482440 ||  || — || February 13, 2012 || Kitt Peak || Spacewatch || — || align=right | 3.9 km || 
|-id=441 bgcolor=#d6d6d6
| 482441 ||  || — || April 26, 2007 || Mount Lemmon || Mount Lemmon Survey || — || align=right | 4.0 km || 
|-id=442 bgcolor=#d6d6d6
| 482442 ||  || — || December 25, 2010 || Kitt Peak || Spacewatch || — || align=right | 3.6 km || 
|-id=443 bgcolor=#fefefe
| 482443 ||  || — || March 14, 2007 || Kitt Peak || Spacewatch || H || align=right data-sort-value="0.77" | 770 m || 
|-id=444 bgcolor=#d6d6d6
| 482444 ||  || — || December 2, 2005 || Catalina || CSS || — || align=right | 2.8 km || 
|-id=445 bgcolor=#fefefe
| 482445 ||  || — || July 31, 1997 || Kitt Peak || Spacewatch || H || align=right data-sort-value="0.67" | 670 m || 
|-id=446 bgcolor=#d6d6d6
| 482446 ||  || — || December 27, 2005 || Kitt Peak || Spacewatch || — || align=right | 2.9 km || 
|-id=447 bgcolor=#fefefe
| 482447 ||  || — || December 27, 2011 || Mount Lemmon || Mount Lemmon Survey || H || align=right data-sort-value="0.77" | 770 m || 
|-id=448 bgcolor=#d6d6d6
| 482448 ||  || — || December 25, 2011 || Mount Lemmon || Mount Lemmon Survey || — || align=right | 2.9 km || 
|-id=449 bgcolor=#d6d6d6
| 482449 ||  || — || September 30, 2010 || Mount Lemmon || Mount Lemmon Survey || — || align=right | 1.7 km || 
|-id=450 bgcolor=#d6d6d6
| 482450 ||  || — || December 6, 2005 || Mount Lemmon || Mount Lemmon Survey || — || align=right | 3.8 km || 
|-id=451 bgcolor=#d6d6d6
| 482451 ||  || — || July 27, 2009 || Kitt Peak || Spacewatch || EOS || align=right | 2.0 km || 
|-id=452 bgcolor=#d6d6d6
| 482452 ||  || — || May 10, 2007 || Kitt Peak || Spacewatch || — || align=right | 3.6 km || 
|-id=453 bgcolor=#d6d6d6
| 482453 ||  || — || February 23, 2012 || Mount Lemmon || Mount Lemmon Survey || critical || align=right | 2.8 km || 
|-id=454 bgcolor=#fefefe
| 482454 ||  || — || September 25, 2005 || Kitt Peak || Spacewatch || H || align=right data-sort-value="0.76" | 760 m || 
|-id=455 bgcolor=#d6d6d6
| 482455 ||  || — || March 18, 2007 || Kitt Peak || Spacewatch || EOS || align=right | 1.6 km || 
|-id=456 bgcolor=#d6d6d6
| 482456 ||  || — || December 2, 2005 || Kitt Peak || Spacewatch || — || align=right | 2.5 km || 
|-id=457 bgcolor=#d6d6d6
| 482457 ||  || — || September 21, 2003 || Campo Imperatore || CINEOS || — || align=right | 5.4 km || 
|-id=458 bgcolor=#d6d6d6
| 482458 ||  || — || December 6, 2010 || Kitt Peak || Spacewatch || — || align=right | 2.8 km || 
|-id=459 bgcolor=#d6d6d6
| 482459 ||  || — || October 25, 2009 || Mount Lemmon || Mount Lemmon Survey || — || align=right | 4.8 km || 
|-id=460 bgcolor=#fefefe
| 482460 ||  || — || June 8, 2007 || Kitt Peak || Spacewatch || H || align=right data-sort-value="0.83" | 830 m || 
|-id=461 bgcolor=#d6d6d6
| 482461 ||  || — || December 27, 2005 || Kitt Peak || Spacewatch || — || align=right | 2.3 km || 
|-id=462 bgcolor=#fefefe
| 482462 ||  || — || March 23, 2012 || Kitt Peak || Spacewatch || H || align=right data-sort-value="0.53" | 530 m || 
|-id=463 bgcolor=#fefefe
| 482463 ||  || — || April 19, 2012 || Mount Lemmon || Mount Lemmon Survey || H || align=right data-sort-value="0.83" | 830 m || 
|-id=464 bgcolor=#fefefe
| 482464 ||  || — || May 14, 2012 || Siding Spring || SSS || H || align=right data-sort-value="0.90" | 900 m || 
|-id=465 bgcolor=#C2FFFF
| 482465 ||  || — || May 30, 2012 || Mount Lemmon || Mount Lemmon Survey || L5 || align=right | 8.9 km || 
|-id=466 bgcolor=#fefefe
| 482466 ||  || — || January 13, 2011 || Mount Lemmon || Mount Lemmon Survey || — || align=right data-sort-value="0.80" | 800 m || 
|-id=467 bgcolor=#FFC2E0
| 482467 ||  || — || June 12, 2012 || Haleakala || Pan-STARRS || APO +1kmPHA || align=right data-sort-value="0.93" | 930 m || 
|-id=468 bgcolor=#fefefe
| 482468 ||  || — || January 30, 2004 || Kitt Peak || Spacewatch || — || align=right | 2.7 km || 
|-id=469 bgcolor=#fefefe
| 482469 ||  || — || October 12, 2009 || Mount Lemmon || Mount Lemmon Survey || — || align=right data-sort-value="0.71" | 710 m || 
|-id=470 bgcolor=#fefefe
| 482470 ||  || — || December 8, 2010 || Mount Lemmon || Mount Lemmon Survey || — || align=right | 1.4 km || 
|-id=471 bgcolor=#fefefe
| 482471 ||  || — || August 24, 2012 || Kitt Peak || Spacewatch || — || align=right data-sort-value="0.74" | 740 m || 
|-id=472 bgcolor=#fefefe
| 482472 ||  || — || August 24, 2012 || Kitt Peak || Spacewatch || — || align=right data-sort-value="0.76" | 760 m || 
|-id=473 bgcolor=#fefefe
| 482473 ||  || — || January 4, 2010 || Kitt Peak || Spacewatch || — || align=right data-sort-value="0.75" | 750 m || 
|-id=474 bgcolor=#fefefe
| 482474 ||  || — || September 23, 2005 || Kitt Peak || Spacewatch || — || align=right data-sort-value="0.86" | 860 m || 
|-id=475 bgcolor=#fefefe
| 482475 ||  || — || August 28, 2001 || Kitt Peak || Spacewatch || MAS || align=right data-sort-value="0.66" | 660 m || 
|-id=476 bgcolor=#fefefe
| 482476 ||  || — || September 21, 2001 || Anderson Mesa || LONEOS || — || align=right data-sort-value="0.72" | 720 m || 
|-id=477 bgcolor=#fefefe
| 482477 ||  || — || September 11, 2001 || Anderson Mesa || LONEOS || — || align=right data-sort-value="0.84" | 840 m || 
|-id=478 bgcolor=#fefefe
| 482478 ||  || — || June 13, 2005 || Mount Lemmon || Mount Lemmon Survey || — || align=right data-sort-value="0.75" | 750 m || 
|-id=479 bgcolor=#fefefe
| 482479 ||  || — || November 19, 2001 || Anderson Mesa || LONEOS || — || align=right data-sort-value="0.81" | 810 m || 
|-id=480 bgcolor=#fefefe
| 482480 ||  || — || December 24, 2005 || Socorro || LINEAR || — || align=right data-sort-value="0.71" | 710 m || 
|-id=481 bgcolor=#fefefe
| 482481 ||  || — || July 30, 2008 || Kitt Peak || Spacewatch || — || align=right data-sort-value="0.75" | 750 m || 
|-id=482 bgcolor=#fefefe
| 482482 ||  || — || October 27, 2008 || Mount Lemmon || Mount Lemmon Survey || — || align=right | 1.0 km || 
|-id=483 bgcolor=#fefefe
| 482483 ||  || — || March 10, 2011 || Kitt Peak || Spacewatch || — || align=right data-sort-value="0.80" | 800 m || 
|-id=484 bgcolor=#fefefe
| 482484 ||  || — || October 30, 2005 || Mount Lemmon || Mount Lemmon Survey || — || align=right data-sort-value="0.90" | 900 m || 
|-id=485 bgcolor=#fefefe
| 482485 ||  || — || September 15, 2012 || Catalina || CSS || V || align=right data-sort-value="0.58" | 580 m || 
|-id=486 bgcolor=#fefefe
| 482486 ||  || — || September 12, 2001 || Socorro || LINEAR || MAS || align=right data-sort-value="0.81" | 810 m || 
|-id=487 bgcolor=#fefefe
| 482487 ||  || — || September 17, 2012 || Kitt Peak || Spacewatch || — || align=right data-sort-value="0.86" | 860 m || 
|-id=488 bgcolor=#FFC2E0
| 482488 ||  || — || September 18, 2012 || Catalina || CSS || APOPHAcritical || align=right data-sort-value="0.41" | 410 m || 
|-id=489 bgcolor=#fefefe
| 482489 ||  || — || December 6, 2005 || Kitt Peak || Spacewatch || — || align=right data-sort-value="0.58" | 580 m || 
|-id=490 bgcolor=#fefefe
| 482490 ||  || — || December 25, 2005 || Kitt Peak || Spacewatch || — || align=right data-sort-value="0.64" | 640 m || 
|-id=491 bgcolor=#fefefe
| 482491 ||  || — || October 14, 2001 || Socorro || LINEAR || — || align=right data-sort-value="0.67" | 670 m || 
|-id=492 bgcolor=#fefefe
| 482492 ||  || — || August 28, 2012 || Mount Lemmon || Mount Lemmon Survey || V || align=right data-sort-value="0.51" | 510 m || 
|-id=493 bgcolor=#fefefe
| 482493 ||  || — || February 16, 2010 || Kitt Peak || Spacewatch || — || align=right data-sort-value="0.75" | 750 m || 
|-id=494 bgcolor=#fefefe
| 482494 ||  || — || June 8, 2008 || Kitt Peak || Spacewatch || — || align=right data-sort-value="0.99" | 990 m || 
|-id=495 bgcolor=#fefefe
| 482495 ||  || — || September 18, 1995 || Kitt Peak || Spacewatch || — || align=right data-sort-value="0.71" | 710 m || 
|-id=496 bgcolor=#fefefe
| 482496 ||  || — || July 30, 2008 || Mount Lemmon || Mount Lemmon Survey || MAS || align=right data-sort-value="0.66" | 660 m || 
|-id=497 bgcolor=#fefefe
| 482497 ||  || — || November 18, 2001 || Kitt Peak || Spacewatch || — || align=right data-sort-value="0.79" | 790 m || 
|-id=498 bgcolor=#fefefe
| 482498 ||  || — || October 23, 2001 || Socorro || LINEAR || — || align=right data-sort-value="0.82" | 820 m || 
|-id=499 bgcolor=#fefefe
| 482499 ||  || — || December 18, 2001 || Socorro || LINEAR || NYS || align=right data-sort-value="0.62" | 620 m || 
|-id=500 bgcolor=#fefefe
| 482500 ||  || — || October 11, 1997 || Kitt Peak || Spacewatch || MAS || align=right data-sort-value="0.72" | 720 m || 
|}

482501–482600 

|-bgcolor=#fefefe
| 482501 ||  || — || February 15, 2010 || Mount Lemmon || Mount Lemmon Survey || MAS || align=right data-sort-value="0.59" | 590 m || 
|-id=502 bgcolor=#fefefe
| 482502 ||  || — || September 14, 2012 || Catalina || CSS || — || align=right data-sort-value="0.72" | 720 m || 
|-id=503 bgcolor=#fefefe
| 482503 ||  || — || September 3, 2008 || Kitt Peak || Spacewatch || — || align=right data-sort-value="0.67" | 670 m || 
|-id=504 bgcolor=#fefefe
| 482504 ||  || — || October 8, 2008 || Kitt Peak || Spacewatch || — || align=right data-sort-value="0.69" | 690 m || 
|-id=505 bgcolor=#FFC2E0
| 482505 ||  || — || October 6, 2012 || Haleakala || Pan-STARRS || APO || align=right data-sort-value="0.44" | 440 m || 
|-id=506 bgcolor=#fefefe
| 482506 ||  || — || March 13, 2007 || Kitt Peak || Spacewatch || — || align=right data-sort-value="0.83" | 830 m || 
|-id=507 bgcolor=#fefefe
| 482507 ||  || — || November 1, 2005 || Kitt Peak || Spacewatch || — || align=right data-sort-value="0.56" | 560 m || 
|-id=508 bgcolor=#fefefe
| 482508 ||  || — || October 9, 2012 || Mount Lemmon || Mount Lemmon Survey || — || align=right data-sort-value="0.82" | 820 m || 
|-id=509 bgcolor=#fefefe
| 482509 ||  || — || September 3, 2008 || Kitt Peak || Spacewatch || — || align=right data-sort-value="0.95" | 950 m || 
|-id=510 bgcolor=#fefefe
| 482510 ||  || — || January 4, 2006 || Mount Lemmon || Mount Lemmon Survey || — || align=right data-sort-value="0.82" | 820 m || 
|-id=511 bgcolor=#fefefe
| 482511 ||  || — || February 25, 2011 || Mount Lemmon || Mount Lemmon Survey || — || align=right data-sort-value="0.80" | 800 m || 
|-id=512 bgcolor=#fefefe
| 482512 ||  || — || July 30, 2008 || Mount Lemmon || Mount Lemmon Survey || MAScritical || align=right data-sort-value="0.57" | 570 m || 
|-id=513 bgcolor=#E9E9E9
| 482513 ||  || — || October 24, 2008 || Kitt Peak || Spacewatch || MAR || align=right data-sort-value="0.86" | 860 m || 
|-id=514 bgcolor=#C2FFFF
| 482514 ||  || — || April 3, 2008 || Mount Lemmon || Mount Lemmon Survey || L5 || align=right | 7.4 km || 
|-id=515 bgcolor=#fefefe
| 482515 ||  || — || September 18, 2012 || Kitt Peak || Spacewatch || — || align=right data-sort-value="0.75" | 750 m || 
|-id=516 bgcolor=#fefefe
| 482516 ||  || — || December 4, 2005 || Kitt Peak || Spacewatch || — || align=right data-sort-value="0.76" | 760 m || 
|-id=517 bgcolor=#fefefe
| 482517 ||  || — || July 30, 2008 || Kitt Peak || Spacewatch || — || align=right data-sort-value="0.78" | 780 m || 
|-id=518 bgcolor=#fefefe
| 482518 ||  || — || November 29, 2005 || Kitt Peak || Spacewatch || — || align=right data-sort-value="0.62" | 620 m || 
|-id=519 bgcolor=#E9E9E9
| 482519 ||  || — || December 4, 2008 || Catalina || CSS || — || align=right | 1.9 km || 
|-id=520 bgcolor=#fefefe
| 482520 ||  || — || November 5, 2005 || Kitt Peak || Spacewatch || MAScritical || align=right data-sort-value="0.62" | 620 m || 
|-id=521 bgcolor=#E9E9E9
| 482521 ||  || — || October 10, 2012 || Mount Lemmon || Mount Lemmon Survey || — || align=right | 1.3 km || 
|-id=522 bgcolor=#fefefe
| 482522 ||  || — || October 24, 2005 || Kitt Peak || Spacewatch || — || align=right data-sort-value="0.86" | 860 m || 
|-id=523 bgcolor=#fefefe
| 482523 ||  || — || March 26, 2011 || Mount Lemmon || Mount Lemmon Survey || — || align=right data-sort-value="0.94" | 940 m || 
|-id=524 bgcolor=#fefefe
| 482524 ||  || — || December 6, 2005 || Kitt Peak || Spacewatch || CLA || align=right | 1.4 km || 
|-id=525 bgcolor=#fefefe
| 482525 ||  || — || September 30, 2005 || Mount Lemmon || Mount Lemmon Survey || V || align=right data-sort-value="0.62" | 620 m || 
|-id=526 bgcolor=#fefefe
| 482526 ||  || — || September 29, 2008 || Catalina || CSS || — || align=right data-sort-value="0.75" | 750 m || 
|-id=527 bgcolor=#fefefe
| 482527 ||  || — || October 10, 2012 || Mount Lemmon || Mount Lemmon Survey || — || align=right data-sort-value="0.74" | 740 m || 
|-id=528 bgcolor=#fefefe
| 482528 ||  || — || February 14, 2010 || Mount Lemmon || Mount Lemmon Survey || V || align=right data-sort-value="0.63" | 630 m || 
|-id=529 bgcolor=#fefefe
| 482529 ||  || — || December 27, 2005 || Kitt Peak || Spacewatch || — || align=right | 1.2 km || 
|-id=530 bgcolor=#fefefe
| 482530 ||  || — || October 14, 2012 || Catalina || CSS || — || align=right data-sort-value="0.94" | 940 m || 
|-id=531 bgcolor=#fefefe
| 482531 ||  || — || September 19, 2008 || Kitt Peak || Spacewatch || — || align=right data-sort-value="0.77" | 770 m || 
|-id=532 bgcolor=#fefefe
| 482532 ||  || — || November 2, 1997 || Kitt Peak || Spacewatch || — || align=right data-sort-value="0.62" | 620 m || 
|-id=533 bgcolor=#FFC2E0
| 482533 ||  || — || October 17, 2012 || Haleakala || Pan-STARRS || ATE || align=right data-sort-value="0.39" | 390 m || 
|-id=534 bgcolor=#fefefe
| 482534 ||  || — || December 5, 2005 || Mount Lemmon || Mount Lemmon Survey || — || align=right data-sort-value="0.75" | 750 m || 
|-id=535 bgcolor=#fefefe
| 482535 ||  || — || September 6, 2008 || Kitt Peak || Spacewatch || — || align=right data-sort-value="0.59" | 590 m || 
|-id=536 bgcolor=#fefefe
| 482536 ||  || — || November 25, 2005 || Kitt Peak || Spacewatch || — || align=right data-sort-value="0.65" | 650 m || 
|-id=537 bgcolor=#fefefe
| 482537 ||  || — || September 22, 2008 || Kitt Peak || Spacewatch || — || align=right data-sort-value="0.78" | 780 m || 
|-id=538 bgcolor=#fefefe
| 482538 ||  || — || September 22, 2008 || Catalina || CSS || — || align=right data-sort-value="0.89" | 890 m || 
|-id=539 bgcolor=#fefefe
| 482539 ||  || — || September 4, 2008 || Kitt Peak || Spacewatch || — || align=right data-sort-value="0.69" | 690 m || 
|-id=540 bgcolor=#fefefe
| 482540 ||  || — || September 27, 2008 || Catalina || CSS || — || align=right | 1.1 km || 
|-id=541 bgcolor=#fefefe
| 482541 ||  || — || February 8, 2010 || Kitt Peak || Spacewatch || NYS || align=right data-sort-value="0.76" | 760 m || 
|-id=542 bgcolor=#E9E9E9
| 482542 ||  || — || November 3, 2008 || Mount Lemmon || Mount Lemmon Survey || — || align=right data-sort-value="0.84" | 840 m || 
|-id=543 bgcolor=#fefefe
| 482543 ||  || — || January 7, 2006 || Kitt Peak || Spacewatch || MAS || align=right data-sort-value="0.57" | 570 m || 
|-id=544 bgcolor=#fefefe
| 482544 ||  || — || November 20, 2001 || Kitt Peak || Spacewatch || — || align=right data-sort-value="0.69" | 690 m || 
|-id=545 bgcolor=#fefefe
| 482545 ||  || — || December 25, 2005 || Mount Lemmon || Mount Lemmon Survey || — || align=right data-sort-value="0.89" | 890 m || 
|-id=546 bgcolor=#fefefe
| 482546 ||  || — || December 24, 2005 || Socorro || LINEAR || — || align=right | 1.2 km || 
|-id=547 bgcolor=#fefefe
| 482547 ||  || — || November 19, 2001 || Socorro || LINEAR || — || align=right data-sort-value="0.85" | 850 m || 
|-id=548 bgcolor=#fefefe
| 482548 ||  || — || February 24, 2006 || Kitt Peak || Spacewatch || — || align=right data-sort-value="0.77" | 770 m || 
|-id=549 bgcolor=#fefefe
| 482549 ||  || — || November 20, 2001 || Socorro || LINEAR || — || align=right data-sort-value="0.73" | 730 m || 
|-id=550 bgcolor=#fefefe
| 482550 ||  || — || January 7, 2006 || Mount Lemmon || Mount Lemmon Survey || — || align=right data-sort-value="0.67" | 670 m || 
|-id=551 bgcolor=#fefefe
| 482551 ||  || — || July 29, 2008 || Kitt Peak || Spacewatch || — || align=right data-sort-value="0.82" | 820 m || 
|-id=552 bgcolor=#fefefe
| 482552 ||  || — || November 25, 2005 || Mount Lemmon || Mount Lemmon Survey || — || align=right | 1.0 km || 
|-id=553 bgcolor=#fefefe
| 482553 ||  || — || May 30, 2008 || Mount Lemmon || Mount Lemmon Survey || — || align=right data-sort-value="0.77" | 770 m || 
|-id=554 bgcolor=#FA8072
| 482554 ||  || — || November 5, 2010 || Catalina || CSS || — || align=right data-sort-value="0.54" | 540 m || 
|-id=555 bgcolor=#E9E9E9
| 482555 ||  || — || October 27, 2012 || Mount Lemmon || Mount Lemmon Survey || — || align=right | 1.7 km || 
|-id=556 bgcolor=#E9E9E9
| 482556 ||  || — || December 21, 2008 || Catalina || CSS || — || align=right data-sort-value="0.89" | 890 m || 
|-id=557 bgcolor=#fefefe
| 482557 ||  || — || October 6, 2008 || Kitt Peak || Spacewatch || — || align=right data-sort-value="0.79" | 790 m || 
|-id=558 bgcolor=#fefefe
| 482558 ||  || — || December 4, 2005 || Kitt Peak || Spacewatch || NYS || align=right data-sort-value="0.59" | 590 m || 
|-id=559 bgcolor=#fefefe
| 482559 ||  || — || December 17, 2001 || Kitt Peak || Spacewatch || — || align=right data-sort-value="0.83" | 830 m || 
|-id=560 bgcolor=#E9E9E9
| 482560 ||  || — || November 20, 2008 || Kitt Peak || Spacewatch || — || align=right data-sort-value="0.79" | 790 m || 
|-id=561 bgcolor=#fefefe
| 482561 ||  || — || September 21, 2008 || Mount Lemmon || Mount Lemmon Survey || NYS || align=right data-sort-value="0.53" | 530 m || 
|-id=562 bgcolor=#FFC2E0
| 482562 ||  || — || November 13, 2012 || Mount Lemmon || Mount Lemmon Survey || APO || align=right data-sort-value="0.36" | 360 m || 
|-id=563 bgcolor=#fefefe
| 482563 ||  || — || September 25, 2008 || Kitt Peak || Spacewatch || NYS || align=right data-sort-value="0.63" | 630 m || 
|-id=564 bgcolor=#fefefe
| 482564 ||  || — || September 6, 2008 || Catalina || CSS || NYS || align=right data-sort-value="0.58" | 580 m || 
|-id=565 bgcolor=#fefefe
| 482565 ||  || — || November 16, 2001 || Kitt Peak || Spacewatch || NYS || align=right data-sort-value="0.62" | 620 m || 
|-id=566 bgcolor=#FFC2E0
| 482566 ||  || — || November 19, 2012 || Siding Spring || SSS || APO || align=right data-sort-value="0.18" | 180 m || 
|-id=567 bgcolor=#E9E9E9
| 482567 ||  || — || November 30, 2008 || Kitt Peak || Spacewatch || — || align=right data-sort-value="0.86" | 860 m || 
|-id=568 bgcolor=#fefefe
| 482568 ||  || — || September 20, 2008 || Kitt Peak || Spacewatch || V || align=right data-sort-value="0.65" | 650 m || 
|-id=569 bgcolor=#E9E9E9
| 482569 ||  || — || November 17, 2008 || Kitt Peak || Spacewatch || — || align=right data-sort-value="0.78" | 780 m || 
|-id=570 bgcolor=#E9E9E9
| 482570 ||  || — || December 2, 2004 || Kitt Peak || Spacewatch || — || align=right data-sort-value="0.83" | 830 m || 
|-id=571 bgcolor=#E9E9E9
| 482571 ||  || — || November 22, 2012 || Kitt Peak || Spacewatch || — || align=right | 1.5 km || 
|-id=572 bgcolor=#E9E9E9
| 482572 ||  || — || October 31, 2008 || Mount Lemmon || Mount Lemmon Survey || — || align=right | 1.7 km || 
|-id=573 bgcolor=#fefefe
| 482573 ||  || — || January 18, 2002 || Kitt Peak || Spacewatch || — || align=right | 1.1 km || 
|-id=574 bgcolor=#E9E9E9
| 482574 ||  || — || December 30, 2008 || Kitt Peak || Spacewatch || — || align=right | 1.1 km || 
|-id=575 bgcolor=#FA8072
| 482575 ||  || — || November 1, 2008 || Mount Lemmon || Mount Lemmon Survey || — || align=right | 1.5 km || 
|-id=576 bgcolor=#E9E9E9
| 482576 ||  || — || January 3, 2009 || Kitt Peak || Spacewatch || — || align=right | 1.1 km || 
|-id=577 bgcolor=#E9E9E9
| 482577 ||  || — || November 20, 2008 || Kitt Peak || Spacewatch || — || align=right data-sort-value="0.89" | 890 m || 
|-id=578 bgcolor=#E9E9E9
| 482578 ||  || — || December 5, 2008 || Kitt Peak || Spacewatch || — || align=right data-sort-value="0.64" | 640 m || 
|-id=579 bgcolor=#E9E9E9
| 482579 ||  || — || December 3, 2012 || Mount Lemmon || Mount Lemmon Survey || — || align=right data-sort-value="0.85" | 850 m || 
|-id=580 bgcolor=#E9E9E9
| 482580 ||  || — || November 28, 1999 || Kitt Peak || Spacewatch || — || align=right | 2.1 km || 
|-id=581 bgcolor=#E9E9E9
| 482581 ||  || — || November 24, 2008 || Kitt Peak || Spacewatch || EUN || align=right | 1.1 km || 
|-id=582 bgcolor=#E9E9E9
| 482582 ||  || — || January 22, 2010 || WISE || WISE || — || align=right | 3.4 km || 
|-id=583 bgcolor=#E9E9E9
| 482583 ||  || — || December 15, 2004 || Kitt Peak || Spacewatch || (5) || align=right data-sort-value="0.59" | 590 m || 
|-id=584 bgcolor=#E9E9E9
| 482584 ||  || — || November 13, 2012 || Mount Lemmon || Mount Lemmon Survey || — || align=right | 2.1 km || 
|-id=585 bgcolor=#E9E9E9
| 482585 ||  || — || December 6, 2012 || Kitt Peak || Spacewatch || — || align=right | 1.4 km || 
|-id=586 bgcolor=#fefefe
| 482586 ||  || — || October 28, 2008 || Mount Lemmon || Mount Lemmon Survey || NYS || align=right data-sort-value="0.55" | 550 m || 
|-id=587 bgcolor=#E9E9E9
| 482587 ||  || — || December 19, 2003 || Kitt Peak || Spacewatch || — || align=right | 1.2 km || 
|-id=588 bgcolor=#E9E9E9
| 482588 ||  || — || September 25, 2012 || Mount Lemmon || Mount Lemmon Survey || — || align=right | 1.6 km || 
|-id=589 bgcolor=#fefefe
| 482589 ||  || — || October 8, 2008 || Mount Lemmon || Mount Lemmon Survey || — || align=right data-sort-value="0.69" | 690 m || 
|-id=590 bgcolor=#E9E9E9
| 482590 ||  || — || December 4, 2008 || Kitt Peak || Spacewatch || — || align=right | 1.2 km || 
|-id=591 bgcolor=#E9E9E9
| 482591 ||  || — || April 27, 2010 || WISE || WISE || — || align=right | 4.1 km || 
|-id=592 bgcolor=#E9E9E9
| 482592 ||  || — || January 28, 2009 || Catalina || CSS || — || align=right | 2.2 km || 
|-id=593 bgcolor=#E9E9E9
| 482593 ||  || — || January 13, 2005 || Kitt Peak || Spacewatch || (5) || align=right data-sort-value="0.69" | 690 m || 
|-id=594 bgcolor=#E9E9E9
| 482594 ||  || — || October 1, 2008 || Kitt Peak || Spacewatch || — || align=right | 1.2 km || 
|-id=595 bgcolor=#E9E9E9
| 482595 ||  || — || June 22, 2010 || Mount Lemmon || Mount Lemmon Survey || — || align=right | 1.9 km || 
|-id=596 bgcolor=#E9E9E9
| 482596 ||  || — || December 8, 2012 || Kitt Peak || Spacewatch || — || align=right | 1.2 km || 
|-id=597 bgcolor=#E9E9E9
| 482597 ||  || — || November 5, 2012 || Kitt Peak || Spacewatch || — || align=right data-sort-value="0.69" | 690 m || 
|-id=598 bgcolor=#E9E9E9
| 482598 ||  || — || January 16, 2009 || Socorro || LINEAR || — || align=right | 1.8 km || 
|-id=599 bgcolor=#E9E9E9
| 482599 ||  || — || December 11, 2012 || Kitt Peak || Spacewatch || — || align=right | 1.7 km || 
|-id=600 bgcolor=#E9E9E9
| 482600 ||  || — || November 26, 2012 || Mount Lemmon || Mount Lemmon Survey || — || align=right data-sort-value="0.98" | 980 m || 
|}

482601–482700 

|-bgcolor=#E9E9E9
| 482601 ||  || — || February 19, 2009 || Catalina || CSS || JUN || align=right | 1.1 km || 
|-id=602 bgcolor=#E9E9E9
| 482602 ||  || — || January 31, 2009 || Mount Lemmon || Mount Lemmon Survey || — || align=right | 1.5 km || 
|-id=603 bgcolor=#E9E9E9
| 482603 ||  || — || January 18, 2009 || Mount Lemmon || Mount Lemmon Survey || — || align=right | 1.3 km || 
|-id=604 bgcolor=#E9E9E9
| 482604 ||  || — || May 7, 2005 || Catalina || CSS || — || align=right | 2.6 km || 
|-id=605 bgcolor=#E9E9E9
| 482605 ||  || — || September 8, 1999 || Kitt Peak || Spacewatch || — || align=right data-sort-value="0.90" | 900 m || 
|-id=606 bgcolor=#E9E9E9
| 482606 ||  || — || December 14, 2004 || Socorro || LINEAR || EUN || align=right | 1.3 km || 
|-id=607 bgcolor=#E9E9E9
| 482607 ||  || — || March 17, 2009 || Kitt Peak || Spacewatch || MRX || align=right | 1.2 km || 
|-id=608 bgcolor=#E9E9E9
| 482608 ||  || — || January 20, 2009 || Mount Lemmon || Mount Lemmon Survey || — || align=right | 1.7 km || 
|-id=609 bgcolor=#E9E9E9
| 482609 ||  || — || February 27, 2009 || Catalina || CSS || — || align=right | 1.3 km || 
|-id=610 bgcolor=#E9E9E9
| 482610 ||  || — || February 20, 2009 || Siding Spring || SSS || — || align=right | 2.0 km || 
|-id=611 bgcolor=#E9E9E9
| 482611 ||  || — || January 16, 2009 || Kitt Peak || Spacewatch || — || align=right | 1.1 km || 
|-id=612 bgcolor=#E9E9E9
| 482612 ||  || — || January 1, 2009 || Mount Lemmon || Mount Lemmon Survey || — || align=right data-sort-value="0.72" | 720 m || 
|-id=613 bgcolor=#E9E9E9
| 482613 ||  || — || February 1, 1997 || Kitt Peak || Spacewatch || — || align=right data-sort-value="0.74" | 740 m || 
|-id=614 bgcolor=#E9E9E9
| 482614 ||  || — || November 19, 2007 || Mount Lemmon || Mount Lemmon Survey || — || align=right | 2.0 km || 
|-id=615 bgcolor=#E9E9E9
| 482615 ||  || — || December 22, 2008 || Kitt Peak || Spacewatch || — || align=right data-sort-value="0.64" | 640 m || 
|-id=616 bgcolor=#E9E9E9
| 482616 ||  || — || March 22, 2010 || WISE || WISE || — || align=right | 3.1 km || 
|-id=617 bgcolor=#E9E9E9
| 482617 ||  || — || April 6, 2005 || Mount Lemmon || Mount Lemmon Survey || — || align=right | 1.2 km || 
|-id=618 bgcolor=#d6d6d6
| 482618 ||  || — || September 29, 2011 || Mount Lemmon || Mount Lemmon Survey || — || align=right | 2.0 km || 
|-id=619 bgcolor=#E9E9E9
| 482619 ||  || — || December 30, 2008 || Mount Lemmon || Mount Lemmon Survey || — || align=right | 1.8 km || 
|-id=620 bgcolor=#E9E9E9
| 482620 ||  || — || January 5, 2013 || Kitt Peak || Spacewatch || — || align=right | 1.5 km || 
|-id=621 bgcolor=#E9E9E9
| 482621 ||  || — || January 19, 2009 || Mount Lemmon || Mount Lemmon Survey || — || align=right data-sort-value="0.80" | 800 m || 
|-id=622 bgcolor=#E9E9E9
| 482622 ||  || — || April 5, 2010 || Kitt Peak || Spacewatch || — || align=right | 1.1 km || 
|-id=623 bgcolor=#E9E9E9
| 482623 ||  || — || April 19, 2009 || Mount Lemmon || Mount Lemmon Survey || — || align=right | 1.6 km || 
|-id=624 bgcolor=#E9E9E9
| 482624 ||  || — || September 20, 2007 || Catalina || CSS || — || align=right | 1.7 km || 
|-id=625 bgcolor=#E9E9E9
| 482625 ||  || — || November 13, 2007 || Mount Lemmon || Mount Lemmon Survey || — || align=right | 2.1 km || 
|-id=626 bgcolor=#E9E9E9
| 482626 ||  || — || January 6, 2013 || Kitt Peak || Spacewatch || — || align=right | 1.2 km || 
|-id=627 bgcolor=#E9E9E9
| 482627 ||  || — || December 8, 2012 || Kitt Peak || Spacewatch || — || align=right | 1.5 km || 
|-id=628 bgcolor=#E9E9E9
| 482628 ||  || — || January 31, 2009 || Mount Lemmon || Mount Lemmon Survey || — || align=right data-sort-value="0.94" | 940 m || 
|-id=629 bgcolor=#E9E9E9
| 482629 ||  || — || February 1, 1995 || Kitt Peak || Spacewatch || PAD || align=right | 1.6 km || 
|-id=630 bgcolor=#d6d6d6
| 482630 ||  || — || November 22, 2006 || Kitt Peak || Spacewatch || — || align=right | 3.9 km || 
|-id=631 bgcolor=#E9E9E9
| 482631 ||  || — || December 22, 2008 || Catalina || CSS || — || align=right | 1.2 km || 
|-id=632 bgcolor=#E9E9E9
| 482632 ||  || — || December 22, 2008 || Kitt Peak || Spacewatch || — || align=right data-sort-value="0.80" | 800 m || 
|-id=633 bgcolor=#E9E9E9
| 482633 ||  || — || January 15, 2005 || Kitt Peak || Spacewatch || critical || align=right data-sort-value="0.78" | 780 m || 
|-id=634 bgcolor=#E9E9E9
| 482634 ||  || — || November 12, 2007 || Mount Lemmon || Mount Lemmon Survey || — || align=right | 1.6 km || 
|-id=635 bgcolor=#E9E9E9
| 482635 ||  || — || October 29, 2003 || Kitt Peak || Spacewatch || MIS || align=right | 2.0 km || 
|-id=636 bgcolor=#d6d6d6
| 482636 ||  || — || September 22, 2011 || Kitt Peak || Spacewatch || — || align=right | 2.3 km || 
|-id=637 bgcolor=#E9E9E9
| 482637 ||  || — || October 20, 2012 || Mount Lemmon || Mount Lemmon Survey || — || align=right | 1.4 km || 
|-id=638 bgcolor=#E9E9E9
| 482638 ||  || — || February 9, 2005 || Kitt Peak || Spacewatch || — || align=right | 1.0 km || 
|-id=639 bgcolor=#E9E9E9
| 482639 ||  || — || June 26, 2011 || Mount Lemmon || Mount Lemmon Survey || — || align=right | 1.3 km || 
|-id=640 bgcolor=#E9E9E9
| 482640 ||  || — || December 30, 2008 || Mount Lemmon || Mount Lemmon Survey || — || align=right | 1.3 km || 
|-id=641 bgcolor=#E9E9E9
| 482641 ||  || — || November 3, 2007 || Kitt Peak || Spacewatch || — || align=right | 1.7 km || 
|-id=642 bgcolor=#E9E9E9
| 482642 ||  || — || December 11, 2012 || Mount Lemmon || Mount Lemmon Survey || — || align=right | 1.1 km || 
|-id=643 bgcolor=#E9E9E9
| 482643 ||  || — || October 24, 2008 || Mount Lemmon || Mount Lemmon Survey || — || align=right data-sort-value="0.81" | 810 m || 
|-id=644 bgcolor=#E9E9E9
| 482644 ||  || — || October 5, 1999 || Socorro || LINEAR || — || align=right | 1.4 km || 
|-id=645 bgcolor=#E9E9E9
| 482645 ||  || — || January 4, 2013 || Siding Spring || SSS || JUN || align=right | 1.2 km || 
|-id=646 bgcolor=#fefefe
| 482646 ||  || — || September 12, 2004 || Socorro || LINEAR || — || align=right | 1.1 km || 
|-id=647 bgcolor=#E9E9E9
| 482647 ||  || — || January 3, 2013 || Mount Lemmon || Mount Lemmon Survey || — || align=right | 1.1 km || 
|-id=648 bgcolor=#E9E9E9
| 482648 ||  || — || February 22, 2009 || Kitt Peak || Spacewatch || — || align=right | 2.0 km || 
|-id=649 bgcolor=#E9E9E9
| 482649 ||  || — || October 23, 2003 || Kitt Peak || Spacewatch || — || align=right | 1.2 km || 
|-id=650 bgcolor=#FFC2E0
| 482650 ||  || — || January 16, 2013 || Haleakala || Pan-STARRS || APOPHA || align=right data-sort-value="0.43" | 430 m || 
|-id=651 bgcolor=#E9E9E9
| 482651 ||  || — || December 22, 2008 || Mount Lemmon || Mount Lemmon Survey || — || align=right data-sort-value="0.73" | 730 m || 
|-id=652 bgcolor=#E9E9E9
| 482652 ||  || — || January 18, 2013 || Mount Lemmon || Mount Lemmon Survey || — || align=right | 1.9 km || 
|-id=653 bgcolor=#E9E9E9
| 482653 ||  || — || October 20, 2011 || Mount Lemmon || Mount Lemmon Survey || — || align=right | 2.1 km || 
|-id=654 bgcolor=#E9E9E9
| 482654 ||  || — || March 4, 2005 || Mount Lemmon || Mount Lemmon Survey || — || align=right | 1.2 km || 
|-id=655 bgcolor=#E9E9E9
| 482655 ||  || — || January 5, 2013 || Mount Lemmon || Mount Lemmon Survey || — || align=right | 1.5 km || 
|-id=656 bgcolor=#E9E9E9
| 482656 ||  || — || October 15, 2007 || Catalina || CSS || — || align=right | 1.1 km || 
|-id=657 bgcolor=#E9E9E9
| 482657 ||  || — || January 5, 2013 || Mount Lemmon || Mount Lemmon Survey || — || align=right | 1.9 km || 
|-id=658 bgcolor=#E9E9E9
| 482658 ||  || — || October 12, 2007 || Mount Lemmon || Mount Lemmon Survey || ADE || align=right | 1.8 km || 
|-id=659 bgcolor=#E9E9E9
| 482659 ||  || — || February 3, 2009 || Mount Lemmon || Mount Lemmon Survey || — || align=right | 1.2 km || 
|-id=660 bgcolor=#E9E9E9
| 482660 ||  || — || February 1, 2009 || Kitt Peak || Spacewatch || — || align=right | 1.1 km || 
|-id=661 bgcolor=#E9E9E9
| 482661 ||  || — || February 4, 2009 || Mount Lemmon || Mount Lemmon Survey || critical || align=right data-sort-value="0.75" | 750 m || 
|-id=662 bgcolor=#E9E9E9
| 482662 ||  || — || September 27, 2011 || Mount Lemmon || Mount Lemmon Survey || — || align=right | 1.9 km || 
|-id=663 bgcolor=#E9E9E9
| 482663 ||  || — || January 8, 2000 || Socorro || LINEAR || — || align=right | 1.9 km || 
|-id=664 bgcolor=#E9E9E9
| 482664 ||  || — || December 13, 2012 || Mount Lemmon || Mount Lemmon Survey || EUN || align=right | 1.1 km || 
|-id=665 bgcolor=#fefefe
| 482665 ||  || — || November 11, 2004 || Kitt Peak || Spacewatch || — || align=right | 1.0 km || 
|-id=666 bgcolor=#E9E9E9
| 482666 ||  || — || November 9, 2007 || Kitt Peak || Spacewatch || — || align=right | 1.6 km || 
|-id=667 bgcolor=#d6d6d6
| 482667 ||  || — || October 23, 2011 || Mount Lemmon || Mount Lemmon Survey || EOS || align=right | 1.7 km || 
|-id=668 bgcolor=#E9E9E9
| 482668 ||  || — || January 19, 2013 || Kitt Peak || Spacewatch || — || align=right | 1.0 km || 
|-id=669 bgcolor=#E9E9E9
| 482669 ||  || — || January 17, 2013 || Mount Lemmon || Mount Lemmon Survey || — || align=right | 2.2 km || 
|-id=670 bgcolor=#E9E9E9
| 482670 ||  || — || February 27, 2009 || Catalina || CSS || — || align=right | 1.6 km || 
|-id=671 bgcolor=#E9E9E9
| 482671 ||  || — || December 30, 2008 || Kitt Peak || Spacewatch || — || align=right | 1.1 km || 
|-id=672 bgcolor=#E9E9E9
| 482672 ||  || — || September 7, 1999 || Catalina || CSS || — || align=right | 1.3 km || 
|-id=673 bgcolor=#E9E9E9
| 482673 ||  || — || November 20, 2007 || Kitt Peak || Spacewatch || — || align=right | 1.8 km || 
|-id=674 bgcolor=#E9E9E9
| 482674 ||  || — || January 19, 2013 || Kitt Peak || Spacewatch || — || align=right data-sort-value="0.94" | 940 m || 
|-id=675 bgcolor=#E9E9E9
| 482675 ||  || — || November 2, 2007 || Mount Lemmon || Mount Lemmon Survey || MRX || align=right data-sort-value="0.80" | 800 m || 
|-id=676 bgcolor=#E9E9E9
| 482676 ||  || — || December 29, 2003 || Catalina || CSS || — || align=right | 1.2 km || 
|-id=677 bgcolor=#E9E9E9
| 482677 ||  || — || March 3, 2009 || Catalina || CSS || — || align=right | 1.1 km || 
|-id=678 bgcolor=#E9E9E9
| 482678 ||  || — || April 20, 2009 || Mount Lemmon || Mount Lemmon Survey || — || align=right | 2.0 km || 
|-id=679 bgcolor=#E9E9E9
| 482679 ||  || — || January 30, 2009 || Mount Lemmon || Mount Lemmon Survey || — || align=right | 1.2 km || 
|-id=680 bgcolor=#d6d6d6
| 482680 ||  || — || January 17, 2013 || Mount Lemmon || Mount Lemmon Survey || BRA || align=right | 1.6 km || 
|-id=681 bgcolor=#E9E9E9
| 482681 ||  || — || February 1, 2009 || Mount Lemmon || Mount Lemmon Survey || — || align=right | 1.4 km || 
|-id=682 bgcolor=#E9E9E9
| 482682 ||  || — || March 1, 2009 || Kitt Peak || Spacewatch || EUN || align=right | 1.0 km || 
|-id=683 bgcolor=#E9E9E9
| 482683 ||  || — || September 4, 1999 || Kitt Peak || Spacewatch || — || align=right data-sort-value="0.77" | 770 m || 
|-id=684 bgcolor=#E9E9E9
| 482684 ||  || — || April 2, 2009 || Mount Lemmon || Mount Lemmon Survey || — || align=right | 1.3 km || 
|-id=685 bgcolor=#E9E9E9
| 482685 ||  || — || October 10, 1999 || Kitt Peak || Spacewatch || (5) || align=right data-sort-value="0.68" | 680 m || 
|-id=686 bgcolor=#E9E9E9
| 482686 ||  || — || January 18, 2009 || Kitt Peak || Spacewatch || — || align=right data-sort-value="0.86" | 860 m || 
|-id=687 bgcolor=#E9E9E9
| 482687 ||  || — || January 7, 2000 || Kitt Peak || Spacewatch || — || align=right | 1.3 km || 
|-id=688 bgcolor=#E9E9E9
| 482688 ||  || — || April 2, 2005 || Kitt Peak || Spacewatch || — || align=right data-sort-value="0.85" | 850 m || 
|-id=689 bgcolor=#E9E9E9
| 482689 ||  || — || January 8, 2013 || Kitt Peak || Spacewatch || — || align=right | 2.1 km || 
|-id=690 bgcolor=#E9E9E9
| 482690 ||  || — || April 1, 2009 || Kitt Peak || Spacewatch || — || align=right | 2.2 km || 
|-id=691 bgcolor=#E9E9E9
| 482691 ||  || — || February 10, 1996 || Kitt Peak || Spacewatch || — || align=right | 1.5 km || 
|-id=692 bgcolor=#E9E9E9
| 482692 ||  || — || January 20, 2013 || Kitt Peak || Spacewatch || — || align=right | 2.9 km || 
|-id=693 bgcolor=#E9E9E9
| 482693 ||  || — || November 1, 2007 || Kitt Peak || Spacewatch || AEO || align=right | 1.3 km || 
|-id=694 bgcolor=#E9E9E9
| 482694 ||  || — || March 3, 2009 || Kitt Peak || Spacewatch || (5) || align=right data-sort-value="0.63" | 630 m || 
|-id=695 bgcolor=#E9E9E9
| 482695 ||  || — || March 1, 2009 || Mount Lemmon || Mount Lemmon Survey || — || align=right | 2.0 km || 
|-id=696 bgcolor=#E9E9E9
| 482696 ||  || — || January 5, 2013 || Mount Lemmon || Mount Lemmon Survey || — || align=right | 1.2 km || 
|-id=697 bgcolor=#E9E9E9
| 482697 ||  || — || March 28, 2010 || WISE || WISE || — || align=right | 3.6 km || 
|-id=698 bgcolor=#d6d6d6
| 482698 ||  || — || April 3, 2008 || Kitt Peak || Spacewatch || — || align=right | 2.9 km || 
|-id=699 bgcolor=#E9E9E9
| 482699 ||  || — || September 20, 2011 || Kitt Peak || Spacewatch || — || align=right | 2.0 km || 
|-id=700 bgcolor=#d6d6d6
| 482700 ||  || — || February 24, 2008 || Mount Lemmon || Mount Lemmon Survey || — || align=right | 2.9 km || 
|}

482701–482800 

|-bgcolor=#E9E9E9
| 482701 ||  || — || January 22, 2004 || Socorro || LINEAR || — || align=right | 3.0 km || 
|-id=702 bgcolor=#E9E9E9
| 482702 ||  || — || August 28, 2006 || Kitt Peak || Spacewatch || — || align=right | 2.4 km || 
|-id=703 bgcolor=#E9E9E9
| 482703 ||  || — || April 18, 2009 || Catalina || CSS || — || align=right | 1.8 km || 
|-id=704 bgcolor=#E9E9E9
| 482704 ||  || — || December 14, 2007 || Mount Lemmon || Mount Lemmon Survey || — || align=right | 2.6 km || 
|-id=705 bgcolor=#E9E9E9
| 482705 ||  || — || April 22, 2009 || Mount Lemmon || Mount Lemmon Survey || EUN || align=right | 1.1 km || 
|-id=706 bgcolor=#E9E9E9
| 482706 ||  || — || December 7, 1999 || Kitt Peak || Spacewatch || — || align=right data-sort-value="0.81" | 810 m || 
|-id=707 bgcolor=#E9E9E9
| 482707 ||  || — || January 17, 2013 || Mount Lemmon || Mount Lemmon Survey || — || align=right | 1.5 km || 
|-id=708 bgcolor=#d6d6d6
| 482708 ||  || — || October 6, 2005 || Mount Lemmon || Mount Lemmon Survey || — || align=right | 2.5 km || 
|-id=709 bgcolor=#E9E9E9
| 482709 ||  || — || January 9, 2013 || Mount Lemmon || Mount Lemmon Survey || — || align=right | 1.1 km || 
|-id=710 bgcolor=#d6d6d6
| 482710 ||  || — || March 10, 2008 || Kitt Peak || Spacewatch || — || align=right | 2.1 km || 
|-id=711 bgcolor=#E9E9E9
| 482711 ||  || — || October 24, 2007 || Mount Lemmon || Mount Lemmon Survey || — || align=right | 1.8 km || 
|-id=712 bgcolor=#E9E9E9
| 482712 ||  || — || October 8, 2007 || Kitt Peak || Spacewatch || — || align=right | 1.3 km || 
|-id=713 bgcolor=#E9E9E9
| 482713 ||  || — || April 21, 2009 || Mount Lemmon || Mount Lemmon Survey || — || align=right | 1.8 km || 
|-id=714 bgcolor=#E9E9E9
| 482714 ||  || — || September 1, 2010 || Mount Lemmon || Mount Lemmon Survey || — || align=right | 1.8 km || 
|-id=715 bgcolor=#E9E9E9
| 482715 ||  || — || November 11, 2007 || Mount Lemmon || Mount Lemmon Survey || — || align=right | 2.2 km || 
|-id=716 bgcolor=#E9E9E9
| 482716 ||  || — || May 11, 2010 || WISE || WISE || — || align=right | 3.7 km || 
|-id=717 bgcolor=#E9E9E9
| 482717 ||  || — || February 18, 2004 || Kitt Peak || Spacewatch || — || align=right | 1.6 km || 
|-id=718 bgcolor=#FFC2E0
| 482718 ||  || — || October 15, 2002 || Palomar || NEAT || AMO || align=right data-sort-value="0.22" | 220 m || 
|-id=719 bgcolor=#E9E9E9
| 482719 ||  || — || February 16, 2004 || Kitt Peak || Spacewatch || — || align=right | 1.1 km || 
|-id=720 bgcolor=#E9E9E9
| 482720 ||  || — || April 2, 2009 || Kitt Peak || Spacewatch || — || align=right | 1.5 km || 
|-id=721 bgcolor=#d6d6d6
| 482721 ||  || — || February 17, 2013 || Kitt Peak || Spacewatch || — || align=right | 2.4 km || 
|-id=722 bgcolor=#E9E9E9
| 482722 ||  || — || January 15, 2008 || Mount Lemmon || Mount Lemmon Survey || DOR || align=right | 1.9 km || 
|-id=723 bgcolor=#d6d6d6
| 482723 ||  || — || March 7, 2013 || Kitt Peak || Spacewatch || — || align=right | 3.1 km || 
|-id=724 bgcolor=#d6d6d6
| 482724 ||  || — || March 4, 2008 || Mount Lemmon || Mount Lemmon Survey || — || align=right | 2.0 km || 
|-id=725 bgcolor=#E9E9E9
| 482725 ||  || — || February 4, 2009 || Mount Lemmon || Mount Lemmon Survey || — || align=right data-sort-value="0.97" | 970 m || 
|-id=726 bgcolor=#E9E9E9
| 482726 ||  || — || January 14, 2013 || Catalina || CSS || — || align=right data-sort-value="0.98" | 980 m || 
|-id=727 bgcolor=#d6d6d6
| 482727 ||  || — || October 7, 2005 || Mount Lemmon || Mount Lemmon Survey || — || align=right | 2.1 km || 
|-id=728 bgcolor=#E9E9E9
| 482728 ||  || — || February 11, 2000 || Kitt Peak || Spacewatch || — || align=right | 1.3 km || 
|-id=729 bgcolor=#E9E9E9
| 482729 ||  || — || September 18, 2011 || Mount Lemmon || Mount Lemmon Survey || JUN || align=right data-sort-value="0.77" | 770 m || 
|-id=730 bgcolor=#d6d6d6
| 482730 ||  || — || March 10, 2008 || Mount Lemmon || Mount Lemmon Survey || — || align=right | 2.7 km || 
|-id=731 bgcolor=#E9E9E9
| 482731 ||  || — || December 18, 2007 || Mount Lemmon || Mount Lemmon Survey || — || align=right | 1.4 km || 
|-id=732 bgcolor=#d6d6d6
| 482732 ||  || — || April 4, 2008 || Kitt Peak || Spacewatch || — || align=right | 3.0 km || 
|-id=733 bgcolor=#d6d6d6
| 482733 ||  || — || April 7, 2008 || Kitt Peak || Spacewatch || EOS || align=right | 2.0 km || 
|-id=734 bgcolor=#E9E9E9
| 482734 ||  || — || March 26, 2004 || Kitt Peak || Spacewatch || — || align=right | 2.2 km || 
|-id=735 bgcolor=#E9E9E9
| 482735 ||  || — || June 17, 1996 || Kitt Peak || Spacewatch || — || align=right | 1.5 km || 
|-id=736 bgcolor=#E9E9E9
| 482736 ||  || — || December 29, 2003 || Kitt Peak || Spacewatch || MIS || align=right | 2.4 km || 
|-id=737 bgcolor=#E9E9E9
| 482737 ||  || — || January 23, 2004 || Anderson Mesa || LONEOS || — || align=right | 1.4 km || 
|-id=738 bgcolor=#d6d6d6
| 482738 ||  || — || January 17, 2013 || Mount Lemmon || Mount Lemmon Survey || EOS || align=right | 1.9 km || 
|-id=739 bgcolor=#d6d6d6
| 482739 ||  || — || April 26, 2008 || Kitt Peak || Spacewatch || — || align=right | 3.1 km || 
|-id=740 bgcolor=#d6d6d6
| 482740 ||  || — || March 12, 2008 || Kitt Peak || Spacewatch || — || align=right | 2.7 km || 
|-id=741 bgcolor=#E9E9E9
| 482741 ||  || — || September 22, 2011 || Kitt Peak || Spacewatch || — || align=right | 1.3 km || 
|-id=742 bgcolor=#d6d6d6
| 482742 ||  || — || September 30, 2005 || Kitt Peak || Spacewatch || — || align=right | 2.1 km || 
|-id=743 bgcolor=#d6d6d6
| 482743 ||  || — || March 13, 2013 || Kitt Peak || Spacewatch || — || align=right | 3.1 km || 
|-id=744 bgcolor=#E9E9E9
| 482744 ||  || — || April 30, 2008 || Mount Lemmon || Mount Lemmon Survey || — || align=right | 2.9 km || 
|-id=745 bgcolor=#E9E9E9
| 482745 ||  || — || March 7, 2013 || Siding Spring || SSS || — || align=right | 1.9 km || 
|-id=746 bgcolor=#E9E9E9
| 482746 ||  || — || November 9, 2007 || Kitt Peak || Spacewatch || — || align=right | 2.1 km || 
|-id=747 bgcolor=#E9E9E9
| 482747 ||  || — || September 24, 2007 || Kitt Peak || Spacewatch || (5) || align=right data-sort-value="0.70" | 700 m || 
|-id=748 bgcolor=#d6d6d6
| 482748 ||  || — || May 14, 2008 || Kitt Peak || Spacewatch || — || align=right | 2.7 km || 
|-id=749 bgcolor=#E9E9E9
| 482749 ||  || — || February 24, 2009 || Mount Lemmon || Mount Lemmon Survey || — || align=right | 1.4 km || 
|-id=750 bgcolor=#d6d6d6
| 482750 ||  || — || October 28, 2005 || Kitt Peak || Spacewatch || — || align=right | 2.7 km || 
|-id=751 bgcolor=#d6d6d6
| 482751 ||  || — || September 1, 2005 || Kitt Peak || Spacewatch || KOR || align=right | 1.6 km || 
|-id=752 bgcolor=#E9E9E9
| 482752 ||  || — || March 15, 2004 || Kitt Peak || Spacewatch || — || align=right | 1.8 km || 
|-id=753 bgcolor=#E9E9E9
| 482753 ||  || — || March 18, 2004 || Kitt Peak || Spacewatch || — || align=right | 2.5 km || 
|-id=754 bgcolor=#E9E9E9
| 482754 ||  || — || June 13, 2009 || Kitt Peak || Spacewatch || — || align=right | 2.0 km || 
|-id=755 bgcolor=#d6d6d6
| 482755 ||  || — || May 3, 2008 || Mount Lemmon || Mount Lemmon Survey || — || align=right | 2.4 km || 
|-id=756 bgcolor=#d6d6d6
| 482756 ||  || — || November 3, 2010 || Mount Lemmon || Mount Lemmon Survey || — || align=right | 2.9 km || 
|-id=757 bgcolor=#E9E9E9
| 482757 ||  || — || March 12, 2013 || Kitt Peak || Spacewatch || — || align=right | 2.5 km || 
|-id=758 bgcolor=#d6d6d6
| 482758 ||  || — || January 14, 2012 || Mount Lemmon || Mount Lemmon Survey || EOS || align=right | 2.1 km || 
|-id=759 bgcolor=#d6d6d6
| 482759 ||  || — || October 31, 2010 || Mount Lemmon || Mount Lemmon Survey || — || align=right | 3.0 km || 
|-id=760 bgcolor=#E9E9E9
| 482760 ||  || — || December 5, 2007 || Catalina || CSS || — || align=right | 2.0 km || 
|-id=761 bgcolor=#d6d6d6
| 482761 ||  || — || March 30, 2008 || Kitt Peak || Spacewatch || — || align=right | 3.2 km || 
|-id=762 bgcolor=#d6d6d6
| 482762 ||  || — || October 26, 2005 || Kitt Peak || Spacewatch || — || align=right | 3.0 km || 
|-id=763 bgcolor=#E9E9E9
| 482763 ||  || — || March 10, 2008 || Catalina || CSS || — || align=right | 1.9 km || 
|-id=764 bgcolor=#d6d6d6
| 482764 ||  || — || September 12, 2010 || Kitt Peak || Spacewatch || — || align=right | 2.9 km || 
|-id=765 bgcolor=#FA8072
| 482765 ||  || — || June 1, 2008 || Kitt Peak || Spacewatch || H || align=right data-sort-value="0.89" | 890 m || 
|-id=766 bgcolor=#FFC2E0
| 482766 ||  || — || April 10, 2013 || Haleakala || Pan-STARRS || APOPHAcritical || align=right data-sort-value="0.49" | 490 m || 
|-id=767 bgcolor=#d6d6d6
| 482767 ||  || — || March 16, 2013 || Catalina || CSS || — || align=right | 3.2 km || 
|-id=768 bgcolor=#d6d6d6
| 482768 ||  || — || October 11, 2010 || Mount Lemmon || Mount Lemmon Survey || — || align=right | 2.8 km || 
|-id=769 bgcolor=#E9E9E9
| 482769 ||  || — || October 3, 2006 || Mount Lemmon || Mount Lemmon Survey || — || align=right | 2.0 km || 
|-id=770 bgcolor=#d6d6d6
| 482770 ||  || — || May 31, 2008 || Mount Lemmon || Mount Lemmon Survey || — || align=right | 3.0 km || 
|-id=771 bgcolor=#d6d6d6
| 482771 ||  || — || October 9, 2010 || Mount Lemmon || Mount Lemmon Survey || — || align=right | 2.8 km || 
|-id=772 bgcolor=#d6d6d6
| 482772 ||  || — || December 13, 2006 || Kitt Peak || Spacewatch || — || align=right | 2.8 km || 
|-id=773 bgcolor=#d6d6d6
| 482773 ||  || — || March 31, 2008 || Mount Lemmon || Mount Lemmon Survey || — || align=right | 4.4 km || 
|-id=774 bgcolor=#d6d6d6
| 482774 ||  || — || February 9, 2007 || Kitt Peak || Spacewatch || — || align=right | 3.0 km || 
|-id=775 bgcolor=#d6d6d6
| 482775 ||  || — || October 13, 1999 || Socorro || LINEAR || — || align=right | 3.2 km || 
|-id=776 bgcolor=#E9E9E9
| 482776 ||  || — || May 10, 2005 || Kitt Peak || Spacewatch || — || align=right | 2.1 km || 
|-id=777 bgcolor=#E9E9E9
| 482777 ||  || — || April 19, 2004 || Socorro || LINEAR || — || align=right | 1.8 km || 
|-id=778 bgcolor=#d6d6d6
| 482778 ||  || — || September 21, 2009 || Kitt Peak || Spacewatch || — || align=right | 3.4 km || 
|-id=779 bgcolor=#E9E9E9
| 482779 ||  || — || October 4, 2006 || Mount Lemmon || Mount Lemmon Survey || — || align=right | 2.1 km || 
|-id=780 bgcolor=#d6d6d6
| 482780 ||  || — || April 11, 2008 || Mount Lemmon || Mount Lemmon Survey || — || align=right | 1.7 km || 
|-id=781 bgcolor=#d6d6d6
| 482781 ||  || — || November 3, 2005 || Mount Lemmon || Mount Lemmon Survey || — || align=right | 1.9 km || 
|-id=782 bgcolor=#d6d6d6
| 482782 ||  || — || November 25, 2005 || Kitt Peak || Spacewatch || — || align=right | 1.9 km || 
|-id=783 bgcolor=#d6d6d6
| 482783 ||  || — || September 18, 2010 || Mount Lemmon || Mount Lemmon Survey || — || align=right | 3.6 km || 
|-id=784 bgcolor=#d6d6d6
| 482784 ||  || — || October 30, 2010 || Mount Lemmon || Mount Lemmon Survey || — || align=right | 2.6 km || 
|-id=785 bgcolor=#d6d6d6
| 482785 ||  || — || October 29, 2010 || Mount Lemmon || Mount Lemmon Survey || — || align=right | 3.3 km || 
|-id=786 bgcolor=#E9E9E9
| 482786 ||  || — || October 20, 2006 || Mount Lemmon || Mount Lemmon Survey || DOR || align=right | 2.4 km || 
|-id=787 bgcolor=#d6d6d6
| 482787 ||  || — || January 16, 2010 || WISE || WISE || — || align=right | 3.5 km || 
|-id=788 bgcolor=#d6d6d6
| 482788 ||  || — || June 1, 2013 || Kitt Peak || Spacewatch || — || align=right | 3.1 km || 
|-id=789 bgcolor=#d6d6d6
| 482789 ||  || — || May 10, 2007 || Catalina || CSS || — || align=right | 4.2 km || 
|-id=790 bgcolor=#d6d6d6
| 482790 ||  || — || June 4, 2013 || Kitt Peak || Spacewatch || — || align=right | 2.5 km || 
|-id=791 bgcolor=#fefefe
| 482791 ||  || — || April 23, 2013 || Mount Lemmon || Mount Lemmon Survey || H || align=right data-sort-value="0.55" | 550 m || 
|-id=792 bgcolor=#d6d6d6
| 482792 ||  || — || December 4, 1999 || Catalina || CSS || — || align=right | 4.2 km || 
|-id=793 bgcolor=#d6d6d6
| 482793 ||  || — || November 22, 2005 || Kitt Peak || Spacewatch || — || align=right | 3.1 km || 
|-id=794 bgcolor=#fefefe
| 482794 ||  || — || December 28, 2003 || Socorro || LINEAR || H || align=right data-sort-value="0.68" | 680 m || 
|-id=795 bgcolor=#fefefe
| 482795 ||  || — || December 4, 2008 || Mount Lemmon || Mount Lemmon Survey || H || align=right data-sort-value="0.67" | 670 m || 
|-id=796 bgcolor=#FFC2E0
| 482796 ||  || — || August 24, 2013 || La Sagra || OAM Obs. || ATEPHA || align=right data-sort-value="0.45" | 450 m || 
|-id=797 bgcolor=#fefefe
| 482797 ||  || — || December 3, 2008 || Catalina || CSS || H || align=right data-sort-value="0.59" | 590 m || 
|-id=798 bgcolor=#FFC2E0
| 482798 ||  || — || August 29, 2013 || Haleakala || Pan-STARRS || APOPHA || align=right data-sort-value="0.74" | 740 m || 
|-id=799 bgcolor=#fefefe
| 482799 ||  || — || January 30, 2012 || Mount Lemmon || Mount Lemmon Survey || H || align=right data-sort-value="0.61" | 610 m || 
|-id=800 bgcolor=#fefefe
| 482800 ||  || — || September 5, 2008 || Kitt Peak || Spacewatch || H || align=right data-sort-value="0.52" | 520 m || 
|}

482801–482900 

|-bgcolor=#fefefe
| 482801 ||  || — || December 27, 2011 || Mount Lemmon || Mount Lemmon Survey || H || align=right data-sort-value="0.70" | 700 m || 
|-id=802 bgcolor=#FA8072
| 482802 ||  || — || October 11, 2010 || Kitt Peak || Spacewatch || — || align=right data-sort-value="0.40" | 400 m || 
|-id=803 bgcolor=#fefefe
| 482803 ||  || — || September 17, 2013 || Mount Lemmon || Mount Lemmon Survey || H || align=right data-sort-value="0.71" | 710 m || 
|-id=804 bgcolor=#fefefe
| 482804 ||  || — || June 11, 2004 || Socorro || LINEAR || H || align=right data-sort-value="0.96" | 960 m || 
|-id=805 bgcolor=#fefefe
| 482805 ||  || — || November 1, 2005 || Catalina || CSS || H || align=right data-sort-value="0.77" | 770 m || 
|-id=806 bgcolor=#d6d6d6
| 482806 ||  || — || October 16, 2013 || Mount Lemmon || Mount Lemmon Survey || — || align=right | 3.1 km || 
|-id=807 bgcolor=#fefefe
| 482807 ||  || — || November 2, 2013 || Mount Lemmon || Mount Lemmon Survey || — || align=right data-sort-value="0.65" | 650 m || 
|-id=808 bgcolor=#fefefe
| 482808 ||  || — || January 16, 2011 || Mount Lemmon || Mount Lemmon Survey || — || align=right data-sort-value="0.64" | 640 m || 
|-id=809 bgcolor=#d6d6d6
| 482809 ||  || — || September 28, 2013 || Catalina || CSS || — || align=right | 3.7 km || 
|-id=810 bgcolor=#d6d6d6
| 482810 ||  || — || October 5, 2013 || Kitt Peak || Spacewatch || — || align=right | 3.2 km || 
|-id=811 bgcolor=#d6d6d6
| 482811 ||  || — || June 10, 2010 || WISE || WISE || — || align=right | 3.0 km || 
|-id=812 bgcolor=#fefefe
| 482812 ||  || — || October 25, 2013 || Kitt Peak || Spacewatch || — || align=right data-sort-value="0.91" | 910 m || 
|-id=813 bgcolor=#fefefe
| 482813 ||  || — || November 26, 2005 || Mount Lemmon || Mount Lemmon Survey || H || align=right data-sort-value="0.68" | 680 m || 
|-id=814 bgcolor=#fefefe
| 482814 ||  || — || November 2, 2013 || Mount Lemmon || Mount Lemmon Survey || — || align=right data-sort-value="0.65" | 650 m || 
|-id=815 bgcolor=#fefefe
| 482815 ||  || — || September 16, 2009 || Mount Lemmon || Mount Lemmon Survey || — || align=right data-sort-value="0.66" | 660 m || 
|-id=816 bgcolor=#fefefe
| 482816 ||  || — || May 27, 2012 || Mount Lemmon || Mount Lemmon Survey || — || align=right data-sort-value="0.81" | 810 m || 
|-id=817 bgcolor=#d6d6d6
| 482817 ||  || — || October 31, 2013 || Kitt Peak || Spacewatch || EOS || align=right | 1.8 km || 
|-id=818 bgcolor=#fefefe
| 482818 ||  || — || November 29, 2005 || Kitt Peak || Spacewatch || H || align=right data-sort-value="0.72" | 720 m || 
|-id=819 bgcolor=#d6d6d6
| 482819 ||  || — || October 6, 2013 || Catalina || CSS || — || align=right | 3.6 km || 
|-id=820 bgcolor=#fefefe
| 482820 ||  || — || May 13, 2004 || Socorro || LINEAR || H || align=right data-sort-value="0.88" | 880 m || 
|-id=821 bgcolor=#fefefe
| 482821 ||  || — || December 7, 2013 || Catalina || CSS || H || align=right data-sort-value="0.98" | 980 m || 
|-id=822 bgcolor=#fefefe
| 482822 ||  || — || January 28, 2006 || Kitt Peak || Spacewatch || H || align=right data-sort-value="0.56" | 560 m || 
|-id=823 bgcolor=#fefefe
| 482823 ||  || — || November 3, 2010 || Catalina || CSS || H || align=right data-sort-value="0.89" | 890 m || 
|-id=824 bgcolor=#C2E0FF
| 482824 ||  || — || December 6, 2013 || Haleakala || Pan-STARRS || other TNO || align=right | 528 km || 
|-id=825 bgcolor=#fefefe
| 482825 ||  || — || March 6, 2011 || Kitt Peak || Spacewatch || — || align=right data-sort-value="0.71" | 710 m || 
|-id=826 bgcolor=#fefefe
| 482826 ||  || — || October 19, 2006 || Catalina || CSS || — || align=right data-sort-value="0.78" | 780 m || 
|-id=827 bgcolor=#fefefe
| 482827 ||  || — || September 29, 2003 || Kitt Peak || Spacewatch || — || align=right data-sort-value="0.57" | 570 m || 
|-id=828 bgcolor=#fefefe
| 482828 ||  || — || February 17, 2007 || Catalina || CSS || — || align=right | 1.2 km || 
|-id=829 bgcolor=#fefefe
| 482829 ||  || — || October 16, 2009 || Catalina || CSS || — || align=right data-sort-value="0.76" | 760 m || 
|-id=830 bgcolor=#fefefe
| 482830 ||  || — || September 20, 2003 || Campo Imperatore || CINEOS || — || align=right data-sort-value="0.59" | 590 m || 
|-id=831 bgcolor=#fefefe
| 482831 ||  || — || July 23, 1998 || Caussols || ODAS || (2076) || align=right data-sort-value="0.78" | 780 m || 
|-id=832 bgcolor=#fefefe
| 482832 ||  || — || September 28, 2009 || Mount Lemmon || Mount Lemmon Survey || V || align=right data-sort-value="0.67" | 670 m || 
|-id=833 bgcolor=#fefefe
| 482833 ||  || — || October 29, 2003 || Kitt Peak || Spacewatch || — || align=right data-sort-value="0.62" | 620 m || 
|-id=834 bgcolor=#fefefe
| 482834 ||  || — || December 14, 2006 || Mount Lemmon || Mount Lemmon Survey || — || align=right data-sort-value="0.65" | 650 m || 
|-id=835 bgcolor=#fefefe
| 482835 ||  || — || September 25, 1998 || Xinglong || SCAP || — || align=right data-sort-value="0.79" | 790 m || 
|-id=836 bgcolor=#fefefe
| 482836 ||  || — || August 23, 2004 || Kitt Peak || Spacewatch || H || align=right data-sort-value="0.81" | 810 m || 
|-id=837 bgcolor=#fefefe
| 482837 ||  || — || October 2, 2006 || Mount Lemmon || Mount Lemmon Survey || — || align=right data-sort-value="0.64" | 640 m || 
|-id=838 bgcolor=#fefefe
| 482838 ||  || — || November 19, 2006 || Catalina || CSS || — || align=right data-sort-value="0.94" | 940 m || 
|-id=839 bgcolor=#fefefe
| 482839 ||  || — || August 24, 2012 || Kitt Peak || Spacewatch || critical || align=right data-sort-value="0.86" | 860 m || 
|-id=840 bgcolor=#fefefe
| 482840 ||  || — || February 7, 2007 || Mount Lemmon || Mount Lemmon Survey || V || align=right data-sort-value="0.59" | 590 m || 
|-id=841 bgcolor=#fefefe
| 482841 ||  || — || January 27, 2007 || Mount Lemmon || Mount Lemmon Survey || — || align=right data-sort-value="0.66" | 660 m || 
|-id=842 bgcolor=#fefefe
| 482842 ||  || — || December 25, 2005 || Mount Lemmon || Mount Lemmon Survey || — || align=right data-sort-value="0.89" | 890 m || 
|-id=843 bgcolor=#fefefe
| 482843 ||  || — || September 19, 2006 || Catalina || CSS || — || align=right data-sort-value="0.78" | 780 m || 
|-id=844 bgcolor=#fefefe
| 482844 ||  || — || September 14, 2009 || Kitt Peak || Spacewatch || — || align=right data-sort-value="0.65" | 650 m || 
|-id=845 bgcolor=#fefefe
| 482845 ||  || — || January 12, 2014 || Mount Lemmon || Mount Lemmon Survey || — || align=right data-sort-value="0.86" | 860 m || 
|-id=846 bgcolor=#fefefe
| 482846 ||  || — || January 6, 2010 || Kitt Peak || Spacewatch || — || align=right data-sort-value="0.93" | 930 m || 
|-id=847 bgcolor=#fefefe
| 482847 ||  || — || May 28, 2008 || Kitt Peak || Spacewatch || — || align=right data-sort-value="0.83" | 830 m || 
|-id=848 bgcolor=#fefefe
| 482848 ||  || — || December 27, 2006 || Mount Lemmon || Mount Lemmon Survey || — || align=right data-sort-value="0.91" | 910 m || 
|-id=849 bgcolor=#fefefe
| 482849 ||  || — || September 17, 2006 || Kitt Peak || Spacewatch || — || align=right data-sort-value="0.62" | 620 m || 
|-id=850 bgcolor=#fefefe
| 482850 ||  || — || February 27, 2007 || Kitt Peak || Spacewatch || — || align=right data-sort-value="0.83" | 830 m || 
|-id=851 bgcolor=#fefefe
| 482851 ||  || — || November 17, 2006 || Kitt Peak || Spacewatch || — || align=right data-sort-value="0.68" | 680 m || 
|-id=852 bgcolor=#fefefe
| 482852 ||  || — || September 18, 2012 || Mount Lemmon || Mount Lemmon Survey || V || align=right data-sort-value="0.63" | 630 m || 
|-id=853 bgcolor=#fefefe
| 482853 ||  || — || March 11, 2007 || Kitt Peak || Spacewatch || — || align=right data-sort-value="0.66" | 660 m || 
|-id=854 bgcolor=#fefefe
| 482854 ||  || — || January 8, 2010 || Kitt Peak || Spacewatch || — || align=right data-sort-value="0.90" | 900 m || 
|-id=855 bgcolor=#fefefe
| 482855 ||  || — || January 20, 2006 || Kitt Peak || Spacewatch || — || align=right data-sort-value="0.98" | 980 m || 
|-id=856 bgcolor=#fefefe
| 482856 ||  || — || September 23, 2012 || Mount Lemmon || Mount Lemmon Survey || — || align=right data-sort-value="0.80" | 800 m || 
|-id=857 bgcolor=#fefefe
| 482857 ||  || — || October 16, 2012 || Mount Lemmon || Mount Lemmon Survey || — || align=right data-sort-value="0.78" | 780 m || 
|-id=858 bgcolor=#fefefe
| 482858 ||  || — || February 8, 2007 || Kitt Peak || Spacewatch || — || align=right data-sort-value="0.51" | 510 m || 
|-id=859 bgcolor=#fefefe
| 482859 ||  || — || April 2, 2011 || Mount Lemmon || Mount Lemmon Survey || — || align=right data-sort-value="0.76" | 760 m || 
|-id=860 bgcolor=#fefefe
| 482860 ||  || — || January 12, 1996 || Kitt Peak || Spacewatch || ERI || align=right | 1.4 km || 
|-id=861 bgcolor=#E9E9E9
| 482861 ||  || — || November 7, 2007 || Mount Lemmon || Mount Lemmon Survey || — || align=right | 1.5 km || 
|-id=862 bgcolor=#fefefe
| 482862 ||  || — || November 27, 2009 || Kitt Peak || Spacewatch || — || align=right data-sort-value="0.72" | 720 m || 
|-id=863 bgcolor=#fefefe
| 482863 ||  || — || February 23, 2007 || Kitt Peak || Spacewatch || (2076) || align=right data-sort-value="0.71" | 710 m || 
|-id=864 bgcolor=#fefefe
| 482864 ||  || — || February 21, 2007 || Mount Lemmon || Mount Lemmon Survey || — || align=right data-sort-value="0.53" | 530 m || 
|-id=865 bgcolor=#E9E9E9
| 482865 ||  || — || September 13, 2007 || Mount Lemmon || Mount Lemmon Survey || — || align=right | 1.2 km || 
|-id=866 bgcolor=#fefefe
| 482866 ||  || — || November 19, 2009 || Kitt Peak || Spacewatch || — || align=right data-sort-value="0.61" | 610 m || 
|-id=867 bgcolor=#fefefe
| 482867 ||  || — || July 13, 2004 || Siding Spring || SSS || — || align=right | 1.1 km || 
|-id=868 bgcolor=#E9E9E9
| 482868 ||  || — || September 13, 2007 || Mount Lemmon || Mount Lemmon Survey || — || align=right | 1.6 km || 
|-id=869 bgcolor=#E9E9E9
| 482869 ||  || — || October 12, 2007 || Kitt Peak || Spacewatch || PAD || align=right | 1.5 km || 
|-id=870 bgcolor=#fefefe
| 482870 ||  || — || January 24, 2007 || Kitt Peak || Spacewatch || — || align=right data-sort-value="0.62" | 620 m || 
|-id=871 bgcolor=#fefefe
| 482871 ||  || — || February 9, 2014 || Kitt Peak || Spacewatch || MAS || align=right data-sort-value="0.63" | 630 m || 
|-id=872 bgcolor=#fefefe
| 482872 ||  || — || January 17, 2007 || Kitt Peak || Spacewatch || — || align=right data-sort-value="0.62" | 620 m || 
|-id=873 bgcolor=#fefefe
| 482873 ||  || — || November 20, 2009 || Mount Lemmon || Mount Lemmon Survey || — || align=right data-sort-value="0.54" | 540 m || 
|-id=874 bgcolor=#fefefe
| 482874 ||  || — || November 14, 1998 || Kitt Peak || Spacewatch || — || align=right data-sort-value="0.68" | 680 m || 
|-id=875 bgcolor=#fefefe
| 482875 ||  || — || September 15, 2009 || Kitt Peak || Spacewatch || — || align=right data-sort-value="0.63" | 630 m || 
|-id=876 bgcolor=#fefefe
| 482876 ||  || — || November 15, 1998 || Kitt Peak || Spacewatch || — || align=right data-sort-value="0.76" | 760 m || 
|-id=877 bgcolor=#E9E9E9
| 482877 ||  || — || December 11, 2012 || Mount Lemmon || Mount Lemmon Survey || (5) || align=right data-sort-value="0.99" | 990 m || 
|-id=878 bgcolor=#fefefe
| 482878 ||  || — || April 6, 1995 || Kitt Peak || Spacewatch || — || align=right data-sort-value="0.83" | 830 m || 
|-id=879 bgcolor=#fefefe
| 482879 ||  || — || September 23, 2005 || Kitt Peak || Spacewatch || — || align=right data-sort-value="0.74" | 740 m || 
|-id=880 bgcolor=#E9E9E9
| 482880 ||  || — || April 26, 2010 || Mount Lemmon || Mount Lemmon Survey || — || align=right | 1.5 km || 
|-id=881 bgcolor=#fefefe
| 482881 ||  || — || March 26, 2007 || Mount Lemmon || Mount Lemmon Survey || — || align=right data-sort-value="0.64" | 640 m || 
|-id=882 bgcolor=#E9E9E9
| 482882 ||  || — || September 18, 2007 || Kitt Peak || Spacewatch || — || align=right | 1.4 km || 
|-id=883 bgcolor=#fefefe
| 482883 ||  || — || November 25, 2006 || Mount Lemmon || Mount Lemmon Survey || — || align=right data-sort-value="0.86" | 860 m || 
|-id=884 bgcolor=#fefefe
| 482884 ||  || — || December 27, 2006 || Mount Lemmon || Mount Lemmon Survey || — || align=right data-sort-value="0.66" | 660 m || 
|-id=885 bgcolor=#E9E9E9
| 482885 ||  || — || April 1, 2005 || Catalina || CSS || — || align=right | 2.2 km || 
|-id=886 bgcolor=#fefefe
| 482886 ||  || — || March 4, 2010 || Kitt Peak || Spacewatch || — || align=right data-sort-value="0.81" | 810 m || 
|-id=887 bgcolor=#E9E9E9
| 482887 ||  || — || February 16, 2010 || Mount Lemmon || Mount Lemmon Survey || — || align=right | 1.6 km || 
|-id=888 bgcolor=#FA8072
| 482888 ||  || — || October 22, 2003 || Kitt Peak || Spacewatch || — || align=right data-sort-value="0.52" | 520 m || 
|-id=889 bgcolor=#E9E9E9
| 482889 ||  || — || January 9, 2006 || Kitt Peak || Spacewatch || MAR || align=right | 1.4 km || 
|-id=890 bgcolor=#E9E9E9
| 482890 ||  || — || May 20, 2006 || Kitt Peak || Spacewatch || — || align=right | 1.0 km || 
|-id=891 bgcolor=#fefefe
| 482891 ||  || — || May 13, 2007 || Kitt Peak || Spacewatch || — || align=right data-sort-value="0.71" | 710 m || 
|-id=892 bgcolor=#fefefe
| 482892 ||  || — || December 18, 2009 || Mount Lemmon || Mount Lemmon Survey || — || align=right data-sort-value="0.87" | 870 m || 
|-id=893 bgcolor=#E9E9E9
| 482893 ||  || — || October 10, 2007 || Mount Lemmon || Mount Lemmon Survey || — || align=right | 1.6 km || 
|-id=894 bgcolor=#E9E9E9
| 482894 ||  || — || October 3, 2003 || Kitt Peak || Spacewatch || — || align=right | 1.6 km || 
|-id=895 bgcolor=#E9E9E9
| 482895 ||  || — || December 8, 2012 || Mount Lemmon || Mount Lemmon Survey || — || align=right | 1.0 km || 
|-id=896 bgcolor=#fefefe
| 482896 ||  || — || May 27, 2003 || Kitt Peak || Spacewatch || NYS || align=right data-sort-value="0.55" | 550 m || 
|-id=897 bgcolor=#fefefe
| 482897 ||  || — || October 13, 2005 || Kitt Peak || Spacewatch || — || align=right data-sort-value="0.65" | 650 m || 
|-id=898 bgcolor=#E9E9E9
| 482898 ||  || — || March 8, 2014 || Mount Lemmon || Mount Lemmon Survey || EUN || align=right | 1.4 km || 
|-id=899 bgcolor=#E9E9E9
| 482899 ||  || — || December 12, 2012 || Mount Lemmon || Mount Lemmon Survey || — || align=right data-sort-value="0.94" | 940 m || 
|-id=900 bgcolor=#E9E9E9
| 482900 ||  || — || May 12, 2010 || Mount Lemmon || Mount Lemmon Survey || — || align=right | 1.7 km || 
|}

482901–483000 

|-bgcolor=#E9E9E9
| 482901 ||  || — || November 30, 2008 || Mount Lemmon || Mount Lemmon Survey || — || align=right data-sort-value="0.96" | 960 m || 
|-id=902 bgcolor=#E9E9E9
| 482902 ||  || — || November 8, 2007 || Kitt Peak || Spacewatch || AGN || align=right | 1.0 km || 
|-id=903 bgcolor=#E9E9E9
| 482903 ||  || — || November 26, 2012 || Mount Lemmon || Mount Lemmon Survey || — || align=right data-sort-value="0.89" | 890 m || 
|-id=904 bgcolor=#E9E9E9
| 482904 ||  || — || January 15, 2009 || Kitt Peak || Spacewatch || EUN || align=right | 1.4 km || 
|-id=905 bgcolor=#d6d6d6
| 482905 ||  || — || October 30, 2011 || Kitt Peak || Spacewatch || — || align=right | 2.0 km || 
|-id=906 bgcolor=#d6d6d6
| 482906 ||  || — || April 27, 2009 || Mount Lemmon || Mount Lemmon Survey || — || align=right | 2.4 km || 
|-id=907 bgcolor=#E9E9E9
| 482907 ||  || — || May 8, 2005 || Kitt Peak || Spacewatch || — || align=right | 2.0 km || 
|-id=908 bgcolor=#E9E9E9
| 482908 ||  || — || September 28, 2003 || Anderson Mesa || LONEOS || EUN || align=right | 1.3 km || 
|-id=909 bgcolor=#d6d6d6
| 482909 ||  || — || September 13, 2004 || Socorro || LINEAR || — || align=right | 3.5 km || 
|-id=910 bgcolor=#E9E9E9
| 482910 ||  || — || October 19, 2011 || Mount Lemmon || Mount Lemmon Survey || — || align=right | 1.5 km || 
|-id=911 bgcolor=#fefefe
| 482911 ||  || — || October 21, 2008 || Mount Lemmon || Mount Lemmon Survey || — || align=right data-sort-value="0.86" | 860 m || 
|-id=912 bgcolor=#E9E9E9
| 482912 ||  || — || October 19, 2007 || Mount Lemmon || Mount Lemmon Survey || — || align=right | 1.2 km || 
|-id=913 bgcolor=#E9E9E9
| 482913 ||  || — || November 7, 2007 || Kitt Peak || Spacewatch || — || align=right | 1.6 km || 
|-id=914 bgcolor=#fefefe
| 482914 ||  || — || October 2, 2008 || Mount Lemmon || Mount Lemmon Survey || — || align=right data-sort-value="0.65" | 650 m || 
|-id=915 bgcolor=#d6d6d6
| 482915 ||  || — || March 2, 2009 || Mount Lemmon || Mount Lemmon Survey || — || align=right | 2.0 km || 
|-id=916 bgcolor=#E9E9E9
| 482916 ||  || — || February 5, 2013 || Mount Lemmon || Mount Lemmon Survey || — || align=right | 2.0 km || 
|-id=917 bgcolor=#E9E9E9
| 482917 ||  || — || October 19, 2011 || Mount Lemmon || Mount Lemmon Survey || — || align=right | 1.7 km || 
|-id=918 bgcolor=#fefefe
| 482918 ||  || — || September 23, 2008 || Mount Lemmon || Mount Lemmon Survey || — || align=right data-sort-value="0.84" | 840 m || 
|-id=919 bgcolor=#E9E9E9
| 482919 ||  || — || May 1, 2006 || Kitt Peak || Spacewatch || — || align=right data-sort-value="0.93" | 930 m || 
|-id=920 bgcolor=#d6d6d6
| 482920 ||  || — || December 26, 2011 || Mount Lemmon || Mount Lemmon Survey || — || align=right | 3.2 km || 
|-id=921 bgcolor=#d6d6d6
| 482921 ||  || — || August 3, 2010 || WISE || WISE || — || align=right | 3.7 km || 
|-id=922 bgcolor=#E9E9E9
| 482922 ||  || — || January 10, 2013 || Kitt Peak || Spacewatch || — || align=right | 2.1 km || 
|-id=923 bgcolor=#d6d6d6
| 482923 ||  || — || August 7, 2010 || WISE || WISE || — || align=right | 4.5 km || 
|-id=924 bgcolor=#E9E9E9
| 482924 ||  || — || February 22, 2009 || Kitt Peak || Spacewatch || — || align=right | 1.7 km || 
|-id=925 bgcolor=#d6d6d6
| 482925 ||  || — || October 29, 2005 || Kitt Peak || Spacewatch || — || align=right | 3.2 km || 
|-id=926 bgcolor=#d6d6d6
| 482926 ||  || — || June 10, 2010 || WISE || WISE || — || align=right | 2.3 km || 
|-id=927 bgcolor=#E9E9E9
| 482927 ||  || — || October 15, 2007 || Mount Lemmon || Mount Lemmon Survey || MAR || align=right | 1.2 km || 
|-id=928 bgcolor=#fefefe
| 482928 ||  || — || May 18, 2010 || WISE || WISE || — || align=right | 2.2 km || 
|-id=929 bgcolor=#E9E9E9
| 482929 ||  || — || January 16, 1997 || Campo Imperatore || CINEOS || — || align=right | 1.3 km || 
|-id=930 bgcolor=#E9E9E9
| 482930 ||  || — || December 7, 1999 || Catalina || CSS || — || align=right | 1.5 km || 
|-id=931 bgcolor=#d6d6d6
| 482931 ||  || — || May 10, 2003 || Kitt Peak || Spacewatch || — || align=right | 4.6 km || 
|-id=932 bgcolor=#d6d6d6
| 482932 ||  || — || May 25, 2003 || Kitt Peak || Spacewatch || — || align=right | 3.1 km || 
|-id=933 bgcolor=#d6d6d6
| 482933 ||  || — || June 18, 2010 || WISE || WISE || — || align=right | 2.9 km || 
|-id=934 bgcolor=#E9E9E9
| 482934 ||  || — || December 2, 2008 || Kitt Peak || Spacewatch || — || align=right | 3.4 km || 
|-id=935 bgcolor=#E9E9E9
| 482935 ||  || — || January 19, 2013 || Mount Lemmon || Mount Lemmon Survey || — || align=right | 1.7 km || 
|-id=936 bgcolor=#d6d6d6
| 482936 ||  || — || June 23, 2010 || WISE || WISE || — || align=right | 4.2 km || 
|-id=937 bgcolor=#d6d6d6
| 482937 ||  || — || November 23, 2006 || Kitt Peak || Spacewatch || EOS || align=right | 1.6 km || 
|-id=938 bgcolor=#E9E9E9
| 482938 ||  || — || November 3, 2011 || Kitt Peak || Spacewatch || — || align=right | 2.6 km || 
|-id=939 bgcolor=#E9E9E9
| 482939 ||  || — || May 4, 2005 || Kitt Peak || Spacewatch || — || align=right | 3.2 km || 
|-id=940 bgcolor=#E9E9E9
| 482940 ||  || — || October 8, 2007 || Mount Lemmon || Mount Lemmon Survey || EUN || align=right data-sort-value="0.92" | 920 m || 
|-id=941 bgcolor=#d6d6d6
| 482941 ||  || — || February 13, 2008 || Mount Lemmon || Mount Lemmon Survey || — || align=right | 2.2 km || 
|-id=942 bgcolor=#d6d6d6
| 482942 ||  || — || February 6, 2007 || Mount Lemmon || Mount Lemmon Survey || — || align=right | 3.4 km || 
|-id=943 bgcolor=#E9E9E9
| 482943 ||  || — || November 15, 2007 || Mount Lemmon || Mount Lemmon Survey || — || align=right | 1.7 km || 
|-id=944 bgcolor=#E9E9E9
| 482944 ||  || — || April 26, 2010 || WISE || WISE || — || align=right | 2.8 km || 
|-id=945 bgcolor=#fefefe
| 482945 ||  || — || November 19, 1995 || Kitt Peak || Spacewatch || — || align=right data-sort-value="0.75" | 750 m || 
|-id=946 bgcolor=#fefefe
| 482946 ||  || — || April 18, 2007 || Mount Lemmon || Mount Lemmon Survey || — || align=right data-sort-value="0.59" | 590 m || 
|-id=947 bgcolor=#E9E9E9
| 482947 ||  || — || October 6, 1999 || Kitt Peak || Spacewatch || — || align=right data-sort-value="0.84" | 840 m || 
|-id=948 bgcolor=#fefefe
| 482948 ||  || — || November 19, 2008 || Mount Lemmon || Mount Lemmon Survey || — || align=right data-sort-value="0.95" | 950 m || 
|-id=949 bgcolor=#d6d6d6
| 482949 ||  || — || July 11, 2010 || WISE || WISE || — || align=right | 4.8 km || 
|-id=950 bgcolor=#fefefe
| 482950 ||  || — || April 24, 2003 || Kitt Peak || Spacewatch || — || align=right data-sort-value="0.69" | 690 m || 
|-id=951 bgcolor=#fefefe
| 482951 ||  || — || March 20, 2007 || Kitt Peak || Spacewatch || — || align=right data-sort-value="0.64" | 640 m || 
|-id=952 bgcolor=#d6d6d6
| 482952 ||  || — || September 29, 2010 || Mount Lemmon || Mount Lemmon Survey || — || align=right | 2.2 km || 
|-id=953 bgcolor=#d6d6d6
| 482953 ||  || — || October 14, 2010 || Mount Lemmon || Mount Lemmon Survey || — || align=right | 2.4 km || 
|-id=954 bgcolor=#E9E9E9
| 482954 ||  || — || December 19, 2007 || Mount Lemmon || Mount Lemmon Survey || — || align=right | 2.6 km || 
|-id=955 bgcolor=#d6d6d6
| 482955 ||  || — || July 13, 2010 || WISE || WISE || — || align=right | 2.9 km || 
|-id=956 bgcolor=#E9E9E9
| 482956 ||  || — || February 1, 2009 || Mount Lemmon || Mount Lemmon Survey || — || align=right | 1.6 km || 
|-id=957 bgcolor=#d6d6d6
| 482957 ||  || — || March 5, 2013 || Mount Lemmon || Mount Lemmon Survey || EOS || align=right | 1.6 km || 
|-id=958 bgcolor=#d6d6d6
| 482958 ||  || — || June 22, 2009 || Mount Lemmon || Mount Lemmon Survey || — || align=right | 2.5 km || 
|-id=959 bgcolor=#E9E9E9
| 482959 ||  || — || January 4, 2013 || Kitt Peak || Spacewatch || — || align=right | 1.0 km || 
|-id=960 bgcolor=#E9E9E9
| 482960 ||  || — || May 1, 2014 || Mount Lemmon || Mount Lemmon Survey || — || align=right | 2.2 km || 
|-id=961 bgcolor=#E9E9E9
| 482961 ||  || — || December 19, 2007 || Mount Lemmon || Mount Lemmon Survey || — || align=right | 2.0 km || 
|-id=962 bgcolor=#E9E9E9
| 482962 ||  || — || December 13, 2004 || Kitt Peak || Spacewatch || — || align=right data-sort-value="0.98" | 980 m || 
|-id=963 bgcolor=#E9E9E9
| 482963 ||  || — || October 8, 2007 || Mount Lemmon || Mount Lemmon Survey || — || align=right | 1.8 km || 
|-id=964 bgcolor=#d6d6d6
| 482964 ||  || — || May 4, 2014 || Mount Lemmon || Mount Lemmon Survey || EOS || align=right | 1.7 km || 
|-id=965 bgcolor=#d6d6d6
| 482965 ||  || — || May 4, 2014 || Mount Lemmon || Mount Lemmon Survey || 7:4 || align=right | 3.1 km || 
|-id=966 bgcolor=#d6d6d6
| 482966 ||  || — || October 27, 2005 || Catalina || CSS || — || align=right | 2.6 km || 
|-id=967 bgcolor=#d6d6d6
| 482967 ||  || — || October 2, 2010 || Kitt Peak || Spacewatch || — || align=right | 2.4 km || 
|-id=968 bgcolor=#d6d6d6
| 482968 ||  || — || July 20, 2010 || WISE || WISE || — || align=right | 2.6 km || 
|-id=969 bgcolor=#E9E9E9
| 482969 ||  || — || December 5, 2007 || Kitt Peak || Spacewatch || PAD || align=right | 1.7 km || 
|-id=970 bgcolor=#d6d6d6
| 482970 ||  || — || September 13, 2009 || XuYi || PMO NEO || — || align=right | 4.2 km || 
|-id=971 bgcolor=#E9E9E9
| 482971 ||  || — || March 2, 2010 || WISE || WISE || — || align=right | 2.2 km || 
|-id=972 bgcolor=#d6d6d6
| 482972 ||  || — || October 28, 2005 || Kitt Peak || Spacewatch || — || align=right | 2.8 km || 
|-id=973 bgcolor=#d6d6d6
| 482973 ||  || — || April 11, 2003 || Kitt Peak || Spacewatch || — || align=right | 2.7 km || 
|-id=974 bgcolor=#E9E9E9
| 482974 ||  || — || March 11, 2005 || Kitt Peak || Spacewatch || — || align=right | 1.5 km || 
|-id=975 bgcolor=#d6d6d6
| 482975 ||  || — || July 27, 2010 || WISE || WISE || — || align=right | 2.8 km || 
|-id=976 bgcolor=#fefefe
| 482976 ||  || — || January 28, 2006 || Kitt Peak || Spacewatch || — || align=right data-sort-value="0.83" | 830 m || 
|-id=977 bgcolor=#fefefe
| 482977 ||  || — || September 29, 2011 || Mount Lemmon || Mount Lemmon Survey || — || align=right | 1.1 km || 
|-id=978 bgcolor=#E9E9E9
| 482978 ||  || — || May 16, 2010 || Mount Lemmon || Mount Lemmon Survey || — || align=right | 1.1 km || 
|-id=979 bgcolor=#E9E9E9
| 482979 ||  || — || November 30, 2008 || Mount Lemmon || Mount Lemmon Survey || — || align=right | 1.4 km || 
|-id=980 bgcolor=#E9E9E9
| 482980 ||  || — || June 10, 2010 || Catalina || CSS || — || align=right | 1.1 km || 
|-id=981 bgcolor=#E9E9E9
| 482981 ||  || — || April 1, 2009 || Mount Lemmon || Mount Lemmon Survey || — || align=right | 2.6 km || 
|-id=982 bgcolor=#d6d6d6
| 482982 ||  || — || January 2, 2009 || Kitt Peak || Spacewatch || 3:2 || align=right | 5.1 km || 
|-id=983 bgcolor=#d6d6d6
| 482983 ||  || — || October 14, 2010 || Mount Lemmon || Mount Lemmon Survey || — || align=right | 2.7 km || 
|-id=984 bgcolor=#d6d6d6
| 482984 ||  || — || January 7, 2006 || Kitt Peak || Spacewatch || — || align=right | 3.2 km || 
|-id=985 bgcolor=#fefefe
| 482985 ||  || — || May 11, 2010 || Mount Lemmon || Mount Lemmon Survey || NYS || align=right data-sort-value="0.56" | 560 m || 
|-id=986 bgcolor=#d6d6d6
| 482986 ||  || — || August 7, 2008 || Kitt Peak || Spacewatch || 7:4 || align=right | 3.6 km || 
|-id=987 bgcolor=#d6d6d6
| 482987 ||  || — || January 5, 2012 || Kitt Peak || Spacewatch || — || align=right | 2.4 km || 
|-id=988 bgcolor=#E9E9E9
| 482988 ||  || — || April 1, 2013 || Siding Spring || SSS || — || align=right | 1.9 km || 
|-id=989 bgcolor=#d6d6d6
| 482989 ||  || — || January 19, 2012 || Haleakala || Pan-STARRS || — || align=right | 3.6 km || 
|-id=990 bgcolor=#E9E9E9
| 482990 ||  || — || April 17, 2009 || Mount Lemmon || Mount Lemmon Survey || — || align=right | 1.3 km || 
|-id=991 bgcolor=#d6d6d6
| 482991 ||  || — || April 3, 2013 || Mount Lemmon || Mount Lemmon Survey || — || align=right | 2.7 km || 
|-id=992 bgcolor=#d6d6d6
| 482992 ||  || — || February 23, 2007 || Mount Lemmon || Mount Lemmon Survey || — || align=right | 2.5 km || 
|-id=993 bgcolor=#d6d6d6
| 482993 ||  || — || January 2, 2012 || Mount Lemmon || Mount Lemmon Survey || — || align=right | 2.8 km || 
|-id=994 bgcolor=#d6d6d6
| 482994 ||  || — || January 4, 2006 || Kitt Peak || Spacewatch || — || align=right | 3.3 km || 
|-id=995 bgcolor=#d6d6d6
| 482995 ||  || — || August 22, 1998 || Xinglong || SCAP || — || align=right | 3.7 km || 
|-id=996 bgcolor=#d6d6d6
| 482996 ||  || — || December 25, 2005 || Kitt Peak || Spacewatch || EOS || align=right | 1.9 km || 
|-id=997 bgcolor=#d6d6d6
| 482997 ||  || — || January 27, 2012 || Mount Lemmon || Mount Lemmon Survey || — || align=right | 2.7 km || 
|-id=998 bgcolor=#E9E9E9
| 482998 ||  || — || August 29, 2005 || Kitt Peak || Spacewatch || — || align=right | 2.7 km || 
|-id=999 bgcolor=#d6d6d6
| 482999 ||  || — || March 15, 2012 || Kitt Peak || Spacewatch || — || align=right | 3.8 km || 
|-id=000 bgcolor=#d6d6d6
| 483000 ||  || — || February 2, 2006 || Mount Lemmon || Mount Lemmon Survey || — || align=right | 2.8 km || 
|}

References

External links 
 Discovery Circumstances: Numbered Minor Planets (480001)–(485000) (IAU Minor Planet Center)

0482